= List of books about negotiation =

This is a list of books about negotiation and negotiation theory by year of publication.

== 2020s ==
- Ury, William (2024). Possible: How we survive (and thrive) in an age of conflict. Harper Business. ISBN 978-0063286900
- Bergman, Mickey; Henican, Ellis (2024). In the Shadows: True Stories of High-Stakes Negotiations to Free Americans Captured Abroad.

== 2010s ==
- Jung, Stefanie; Krebs, Peter (2019). The Essentials of Contract Negotiation. Springer. ISBN 978-3-030-12866-1.
- Baarslag, Tim (2016). Exploring the strategy space of negotiating agents: a framework for bidding, learning and accepting in automated negotiation. Springer Theses. Springer Publishing. doi:10.1007/978-3-319-28243-5. ISBN 9783319282428. OCLC 985062026.
- Malhotra, Deepak (2016). Negotiating the impossible: how to break deadlocks and resolve ugly conflicts (without money or muscle). Oakland, CA: Berrett-Koehler Publishers. ISBN 9781626566972. OCLC 922912950.
- Shapiro, Daniel (2016). Negotiating the nonnegotiable: how to resolve your most emotionally charged conflicts. New York: Viking Press. ISBN 9780670015566. OCLC 940455286.
- Fatima, Shaheed; Kraus, Sarit; Wooldridge, Michael (2015). Principles of automated negotiation. Cambridge, UK; New York: Cambridge University Press. doi:10.1017/CBO9780511751691. ISBN 9781107002548. OCLC 878117304.
- Ury, William (2015). Getting to yes with yourself (and other worthy opponents). New York: HarperOne. ISBN 9780062363381. OCLC 885983402.
- Susskind, Lawrence (2014). Good for you, great for me: finding the trading zone and winning at win-win negotiation. New York: PublicAffairs. ISBN 9781610394253. OCLC 868147520.
- Salacuse, Jeswald W. (2013). Negotiating life: secrets for everyday diplomacy and deal making. New York: Palgrave Macmillan. ISBN 9781137034762. OCLC 830837538.
- Sycara, Katia; Gelfand, Michele J.; Abbe, Allison, eds. (2013). Models for intercultural collaboration and negotiation. Advances in group decision and negotiation. Vol. 6. Dordrecht; New York: Springer Verlag. doi:10.1007/978-94-007-5574-1. ISBN 9789400755734. OCLC 806020867. S2CID 19693983.
- Islam, Shafiqul; Susskind, Lawrence (2012). Water diplomacy: a negotiated approach to managing complex water networks. RFF Press water policy series. New York: RFF Press. ISBN 9781617261022. OCLC 730414042.
- Subramanian, Guhan (2011). Dealmaking: new dealmaking strategies for a competitive marketplace. New York: W. W. Norton & Company. ISBN 9780393339956. OCLC 317919899.
- Eemeren, Frans H. van (2010). Strategic maneuvering in argumentative discourse: extending the pragma-dialectical theory of argumentation. Argumentation in context. Vol. 2. Amsterdam; Philadelphia: John Benjamins Publishing. ISBN 9789027211194. OCLC 522429411.
- Mnookin, Robert H. (2010). Bargaining with the devil: when to negotiate, when to fight. New York: Simon & Schuster. ISBN 9781416583325. OCLC 432993830.

== 2000s ==
- Movius, Hallam; Susskind, Lawrence (2009). Built to win: creating a world-class negotiating organization. Boston: Harvard Business Press. ISBN 9781422110478. OCLC 270129737.
- Matthias Schranner (2008). Costly Mistakes. Leck: CPI Books GmbH. ISBN 978-3033031869
- Malhotra, Deepak; Bazerman, Max H. (2007). Negotiation genius: how to overcome obstacles and achieve brilliant results at the bargaining table and beyond. New York: Bantam Books. ISBN 9780553804881. OCLC 133465464.
- Ury, William (2007). The power of a positive No: how to say No and still get to Yes. New York: Bantam Books. ISBN 9780553804980. OCLC 70718568.
- Lax, David A.; Sebenius, James K. (2006). 3-D negotiation: powerful tools to change the game in your most important deals. Boston: Harvard Business School Press. ISBN 1591397995. OCLC 64624895.
- Schneider, Andrea Kupfer; Honeyman, Christopher, eds. (2006). The negotiator's fieldbook. Washington, DC: American Bar Association, Section of Dispute Resolution. ISBN 1590315456. OCLC 70232339. (Includes chapters by I. William Zartman and others.)
- Watkins, Michael D. (2006). Shaping the game: the new leader's guide to effective negotiating. Boston: Harvard Business School Press. ISBN 1422102521. OCLC 62858075.
- Fisher, Roger; Shapiro, Daniel (2005). Beyond reason: using emotions as you negotiate. New York: Viking Press. ISBN 0670034509. OCLC 58789328.
- Langholtz, Harvey J.; Stout, Chris E., eds. (2004). The psychology of diplomacy. Psychological dimensions to war and peace. Westport, CT: Praeger Publishers. ISBN 0275971449. OCLC 53887514.
- Menkel-Meadow, Carrie; Wheeler, Michael; Program on Negotiation, eds. (2004). What's fair: ethics for negotiators. San Francisco: Jossey-Bass. ISBN 0787969168. OCLC 53443074.
- Spangle, Michael; Isenhart, Myra Warren (2003). Negotiation: communication for diverse settings. Thousand Oaks, CA: SAGE Publications. ISBN 0761923489. OCLC 50166807. (Includes chapters on Lawrence Susskind, William Ury, and others.)
- Raiffa, Howard; Richardson, John; Metcalfe, David (2002). Negotiation analysis: the science and art of collaborative decision making. Cambridge, MA: Belknap Press of Harvard University Press. ISBN 0674008901. OCLC 50042928.
- Mnookin, Robert H.; Peppet, Scott R.; Tulumello, Andrew S. (2000). Beyond winning: negotiating to create value in deals and disputes. Cambridge, MA: Belknap Press of Harvard University Press. ISBN 0674003357. OCLC 43864465.

== 1990s ==
- Hammond, John S.; Keeney, Ralph L.; Raiffa, Howard (1999). Smart choices: a practical guide to making better decisions. Boston: Harvard Business School Press. ISBN 0875848575. OCLC 39217726.
- Mnookin, Robert H.; Susskind, Lawrence; Foster, Pacey C., eds. (1999). Negotiating on behalf of others: advice to lawyers, business executives, sports agents, diplomats, politicians, and everybody else. Sage series on negotiation and dispute resolution. Thousand Oaks, CA: SAGE Publications. ISBN 0761913262. OCLC 41641184.
- Shell, G. Richard (2006) [1999]. Bargaining for advantage: negotiation strategies for reasonable people (2nd ed.). New York: Penguin Books. ISBN 0143036971. OCLC 62593720.
- Susskind, Lawrence; McKearnan, Sarah; Thomas-Larmer, Jennifer, eds. (1999). The consensus building handbook: a comprehensive guide to reaching agreement. Thousand Oaks, CA: SAGE Publications. ISBN 0761908447. OCLC 41176583.
- Ury, William (2000) [1999]. The third side: why we fight and how we can stop (Revised ed.). New York: Penguin Books. ISBN 0140296344. OCLC 45610553.
- Fisher, Roger; Sharp, Alan; Richardson, John (1998). Getting it done: how to lead when you're not in charge. New York: HarperBusiness. ISBN 0887308422. OCLC 38390853.
- Shapiro, Ronald M.; Jankowski, Mark A.; Dale, Jim (2001) [1998]. The power of nice: how to negotiate so everyone wins—especially you! (Revised ed.). New York: John Wiley & Sons. ISBN 0471080721. OCLC 47118719.
- Lewicki, Roy J.; Barry, Bruce; Saunders, David M. (2016) [1997]. Essentials of negotiation (6th ed.). New York: McGraw-Hill Education. ISBN 9780077862466. OCLC 897510519.
- Nielsen, Richard P. (1996). The politics of ethics: methods for acting, learning, and sometimes fighting with others in addressing ethics problems in organizational life. New York: Oxford University Press. ISBN 0195096657. OCLC 34517566.
- Zeckhauser, Richard; Keeney, Ralph L.; Sebenius, James K. (1996). Wise choices: decisions, games, and negotiations. Harvard Business School Press. ISBN 9780875846774. OCLC 33208025.
- Breslin, J. William; Rubin, Jeffrey Z., eds. (1995). Negotiation theory and practice. Cambridge, MA: Program on Negotiation at Harvard Law School. ISBN 1880711001. OCLC 28586565. (Includes chapters by Max H. Bazerman, Roger Fisher, Mary Parker Follett, William Ury, I. William Zartman, and others.)
- Dawson, Roger (2011) [1995]. Secrets of power negotiating: inside secrets from a master negotiator (15th anniversary ed.). Pompton Plains, NJ: Career Press. ISBN 978-1601631398. OCLC 609531871.
- Kramer, Roderick Moreland; Messick, David M., eds. (1995). Negotiation as a social process. Thousand Oaks, CA: SAGE Publications. ISBN 0803957378. OCLC 31899954. (Includes chapters by Max H. Bazerman and others.)
- Marcus, Leonard J.; Dorn, Barry C.; McNulty, Eric J. (2011) [1995]. Renegotiating health care: resolving conflict to build collaboration (2nd ed.). San Francisco: Jossey-Bass. ISBN 9780470562208. OCLC 32702049.
- Egan, Gerard (1994). Working the shadow side: a guide to positive behind-the-scenes management. San Francisco: Jossey-Bass. ISBN 0787900117. OCLC 30777062.
- Walton, Richard E.; Cutcher-Gershenfeld, Joel; McKersie, Robert B. (1994). Strategic negotiations: a theory of change in labor–management relations. Boston: Harvard Business School Press. ISBN 0875845517. OCLC 29668531.
- Bazerman, Max H.; Neale, Margaret Ann (1992). Negotiating rationally. New York: Free Press. ISBN 0029019850. OCLC 24502013.
- Ury, William (2007) [1991]. Getting past no: negotiating in difficult situations (Revised ed.). New York: Bantam Books. ISBN 9780553371314. OCLC 145950735.
- Brams, Steven J. (2003) [1990]. Negotiation games: applying game theory to bargaining and arbitration (2nd ed.). London; New York: Routledge. ISBN 041530895X. OCLC 252903980.
- Mansbridge, Jane J., ed. (1990). Beyond self-interest. Chicago: University of Chicago Press. ISBN 0226503593. OCLC 20418474.

== 1980s ==
- Fisher, Roger; Brown, Scott (1989) [1988]. Getting together: building relationships as we negotiate. New York: Penguin Books. ISBN 0140126384. OCLC 19458250.
- Susskind, Lawrence; Cruikshank, Jeffrey L. (1987). Breaking the impasse: consensual approaches to resolving public disputes. New York: Basic Books. ISBN 0465007511. OCLC 16717079.
- Lax, David A.; Sebenius, James K. (1986). The manager as negotiator: bargaining for cooperation and competitive gain. New York: Free Press. ISBN 0029187702. OCLC 13947457.
- Fisher, Roger; Ury, William; Patton, Bruce (2011) [1981]. Getting to yes: negotiating agreement without giving in (3rd ed.). New York: Penguin Books. ISBN 9780143118756. OCLC 609540048.
- Raiffa, Howard (1982). The art and science of negotiation. Cambridge, MA: Belknap Press of Harvard University Press. ISBN 0674048121. OCLC 8409383.
- Cohen, Herb (1980). You can negotiate anything. Secaucus, NJ: L. Stuart. ISBN 0818403055. OCLC 6789870.

== pre-1980s ==
- Zartman, I. William, ed. (1978). The negotiation process: theories and applications. Beverly Hills, CA: SAGE Publications. ISBN 0803911416. OCLC 4570302.
- Nierenberg, Gerard I.; Calero, Henry H. (2009) [1968]. The new art of negotiating: how to close any deal (Updated ed.). Garden City Park, NY: Square One Publishers. ISBN 9780757003059. OCLC 277086129.
