= Mutual Gains Approach =

The Mutual Gains Approach (MGA) to negotiation is a process model, based on experimental findings and hundreds of real-world cases, that lays out four steps for negotiating better outcomes while protecting relationships and reputation. A central tenet of the model, and the robust theory that underlies it, is that a vast majority of negotiations in the real world involve parties who have more than one goal or concern in mind and more than one issue that can be addressed in the agreement they reach. The model allows parties to improve their chances of creating an agreement superior to existing alternatives.

MGA is not the same as "win-win" (the idea that all parties must, or will, feel delighted at the end of the negotiation) and does not focus on "being nice" or "finding common ground." Rather, it emphasizes careful analysis and good process management.

== Steps ==
The four step Mutual Gains Approach was developed by scholars and practitioners at the Consensus Building Institute, a Cambridge, Massachusetts based company founded by MIT professor Lawrence Susskind. The four steps of the Mutual Gains Approach are:

=== Preparation ===
Prepare by understanding interests and alternatives. More specifically, estimate your BATNA and how other parties see theirs (BATNA stands for “best alternative to a negotiated agreement”). Having a good alternative to agreement increases your power at the table. At the same time, work to understand your own side’s interests as well as the interests of the other parties. Interests are the kind of things that a person or organization cares about, in ranked order.

Good negotiators listen for the interests behind positions or the demands that are made. For instance, “I won’t pay more than ninety thousand” is a position; the interests behind the position might include limiting the size of the down payment; a fear that the product or service might prove unreliable; and assumptions about the interest rates attached to future payments. The party might also be failing to articulate other non-financial interests that are nonetheless important.

=== Value creation ===
Create value by inventing without committing. Based on the interests uncovered or shared, parties should declare a period of “inventing without committing” during which they advance options by asking “what if…?” By floating different options and “packages” —bundles of options across issues—parties can discover additional interests, create options that had not previously been imagined, and generate opportunities for joint gain by trading across issues they value differently.

=== Value distribution ===
At some point in a negotiation, parties have to decide on a final agreement. The more value they have created, the easier this will be, but research suggests that parties default very easily into positional bargaining when they try to finalize details of agreements. Parties should divide value by finding objective criteria that all parties can use to justify their “fair share” of the value created.

By identifying criteria or principles that support or guide difficult allocation decisions, parties at the negotiating table can help the groups or organizations they represent to understand why the final package is not only supportable, but fundamentally “fair.” This improves the stability of agreements, increases the chances of effective implementation, and protects relationships.

=== Follow through ===
Follow through by imagining future challenges and their solutions. Parties near the end of difficult negotiations—or those who will “hand off” the agreement to others for implementation—often forget to strengthen the agreement by imagining the kinds of things that could derail it or produce future conflicts or uncertainty.

While it is difficult to focus on potential future challenges, it is wise to include specific provisions in the final document that focus on monitoring the status of commitments; communicating regularly; resolving conflicts or confusions that arise; aligning incentives and resources with the commitments required; and helping other parties who may become a de facto part of implementing the agreement. Including these provisions makes the agreement more robust and greatly assists the parties who will have to live with it and by it.

== See also ==
- Program on Negotiation
- Getting to YES

== Bibliography ==
- Aarow, K. J., et al. (Eds.). (1995). Barriers to Conflict Resolution. Norton: New York, NY.
- Anderson, J., & Yaffee, S. (1998). Balancing Public Trust and Private Interest: Public Participation in Habitat Conservation Planning, A Summary Report. A research report commissioned by the National Wildlife Federation. University of Michigan Press: Ann Arbor, MI.
- Bacow, L. S. & Wheeler, M. (1984). Environmental Disputer Resolution. Plenum: New York, NY.
- Bazerman, M, & Neal, M. A. (1992). Negotiating Rationally. Free Press: New York, NY. ISBN 0-02-901986-9
- Bazerman, M., & Watkins, M. (2004). Predictable surprises: the disasters you should have seen coming, and how to prevent them. Harvard Business School Press: Boston, MA.
- Bellah, R. N., Madsen, R., Sullivan, W. M., Swidler, A., & Tipton, S. M. (1985). Habits of the Heart: individualism and commitment in American life. University of California Press: Berkeley, CA.
- Bingham, G. (1986). Resolving environmental disputes: a decade of experience The Conservation Foundation: Washington, DC
- Bush, R. A. B., & Folger, J. B. (1994). The Promise of Mediation. Jossey-Bass: San Francisco, CA.
- Caldini, R. (2001). Influence: science and practice (4th Ed). Allyn & Bacon: Needham Heights, MA. ISBN 0-321-01147-3
- Carpenter, S. L., & Kennedy, W. J. D. (1988). Managing Public Disputes. Jossey-Bass: San Francisco, CA.
- Costantino, C. A., & Merchant, C. S. (1996). Designing Conflict Management Systems: a guide to create productive and healthy organizations. Jossy-Bass: San Francisco, CA.
- Crowfoot, J. E., & Wondolleck, J. M. (1990). Environmental Disputes: community involvement in conflict resolution. Island: Washington, D.C.
- Doyle, M., & Straus, D. (1982). How to Make Meetings Work. Jove: New York, NY
- Duke, E. F. (1996). Resolving Public Conflict. transformation community and governance. St. Martin's: New York, NY
- Fisher, R., & Brown, S. (1988). Getting Together: building relationships that get to yes. Houghton Mifflin: Boston, MA. ISBN 0-14-012638-4
- Fisher, R., Ury, W., & Patton, B. (1991). Getting to YES: negotiating agreement without giving in (2nd Ed.). Penguin Books USA Inc.: New York, NY. ISBN 0-14-015735-2
- Fisher, R. J. (1996). Interactive Conflict Resolution. Syracuse University Press: Syracuse, NY.
- Folger, J. P., Pooles, M. S. & Stutman, R. K. (2001). Working Through Conflict. Addison-Wesley: Boston, MA.
- Golann, D. (1996). Mediating Legal Disputes. Aspen Law and Business: New York, NY.
- Goldberg, S. B., Green, E., & Sander, F. (1985). Dispute Resolution. Little, Brown: Boston, MA.
- Gray, B. (1989). Collaborating: finding common ground for multiparty problems. Jossey-Bass: San Francisco, CA.
- Kener, S. (1996). Facilitator's Guide to Participatory Decision Making. New Society: Philadelphia, PA.
- Kramer, R. M., & Messick, D. M. (Eds.). (1995). Negotiation as a Social Process. Sage: Thousand Oaks, CA.
- Kritek, P. B. (1994). Negotiation at an Uneven Table. Jossey-Bass: San Francisco, CA.
- Lax, D. A., & Sebenius, J. K. (1986). The Manager as Negotiator: bargaining for cooperative and competitive gain. Free Press: New York, NY.
- Lax, D. A., & Sebenius, J. K. (2006). 3D Negotiation: powerful tools to change the game in your most important deals. Harvard Business School Press: Boston, MA. ISBN 1-59139-799-5
- Lewicki, R., & Litterer, J. (1985). Negotiation. Irwin: Homewood, IL. ISBN 0-256-02633-5
- Lewicki, R., Gray, B., & Elliott, M. (Eds.). (2002). Making Sense of Intractable Environmental Conflicts: Concepts and Cases (1 ed.). Washington DC: Island Press.
- Lewicki, R. J., Barry, B., & Saunders, D. M. (2007). Essential Negotiation. McGraw-Hill/Irwin: Boston, MA.
- Mansbridge, J. (1983). Beyond Adversary Democracy. University of Chicago Press: Chicago, IL.
- Mayer, B. (2004). Beyond Neutrality: confronting the crisis in conflict resolution. Jossey-Bass: San Francisco, CA.
- Mnookin, R. & Susskind, L. E. (1999). Negotiating on Behalf of Others. Sage: Thousand Oaks, CA.
- Mnookin, R., Pepper, S, & Tulumello, A. (2000). Beyond Winning: negotiating to create value in deals and disputes. Harvard University Press: Cambridge, Massachusetts. ISBN 0-674-00335-7
- Moore, C. W. (1996). The Mediation Process: practical strategies for resolving conflict (2nd Ed.). Jossey-Bass: San Francisco, CA.
- Movius, H., & Susskind, L. (2009). Built to Win: creating a world-class negotiation organization. Harvard Business Press: Boston, MA. ISBN 978-1-4221-1047-8
- Ozawa, C. P. (1990). Recasting Science: consensual procedures in public policy making. Westview: San Francisco, CA.
- Raiffa, H. (1982). The Art and Science of Negotiation. Harvard University Press: Cambridge, Massachusetts.
- Raiffa, H., Richardson, D., & Metcalfe, D. (2002). Negotiation Analysis: The science and art of collective decision making. Harvard University Press: Cambridge, Massachusetts. ISBN 0-674-04812-1
- Rogers, N., McEwen, C. (1994). Mediation: law, policy and practice. Clark Boardman Callaghan: Deerfield, IL.
- Rothman, J. (1997). Resolving Identity Based Conflicts. Jossey-Bass: San Francisco, CA.
- Rubin, J. Z., Pruitt, D. G., & Kim, S. H. (1994). Social Conflict: escalation, stalemate, and settlement (2nd E.). McGraw-Hill: New York, NY. ISBN 0-07-054211-2
- Schwartz, R. M. (1994). The Skilled Facilitator: practical wisdom for developing effective groups. Jossey-Bass: San Francisco, CA.
- Susskind, L. & Cruikshank, J. (1987). Breaking the Impasse: consensual approaches to resolve public disputes. Basic Books Inc.: New York, NY. ISBN 0-465-00750-3
- Susskind, L. & Field, P. (1996). Dealing With An Angry Public: the mutual gains approach to resolving disputes. The Reef Press: New York, NY ISBN 0-684-82302-0
- Susskind, L., Amundsen, O., Matsuura, M., Kaplan, M., & Lampe, D. (1999). Using Assisted Negotiation to Settle Land Use Disputes, A Guidebook for Public Officials. Consensus Building Institute and Lincoln Institute of Land Policy
- Susskind, L., McKearnan, S. & Thomas-Larmer, J. (1999). The Consensus Building Handbook: a comprehensive guide to reaching agreement. Sage Publications Inc.: Thousand Oaks, CA. ISBN 0-7619-0844-7
- Susskind, L. & Cruikshank, J. (2006). Breaking Robert's Rule: the new way to run meetings, build consensus, and get results. Oxford University Press: New York, NY. ISBN 978-0-19-530836-5
- Thompson, L. (2004). The Mind and Heart of a Negotiator. Prentice Hall: Upper Saddle River, NJ.
- Ury, W. L. (1993). Getting Past NO: negotiating your way from confrontation to cooperation. Bantam: New York, NY.
- Ury, W. L., Brett, J. M., & Goldberg, S. B. (1993). Getting Disputes Resolved: designing systems to cut the costs of conflict. Program on Negotiation Books. Cambridge, Massachusetts.
- Watkins, M. (2002). Breakthrough Business Negotiations. Jossey-Bass: San Francisco, CA.
- Weisbord, M. R. et al. (1992). Discovering Common Ground. Berrett-Koehler: San Francisco, CA.
- Zartman, W., & Rubin, J (Eds.). (2000). Power and Negotiation. University of Michigan Press: Ann Arbor, MI.
