= Rogerian argument =

Conflict-solving technique

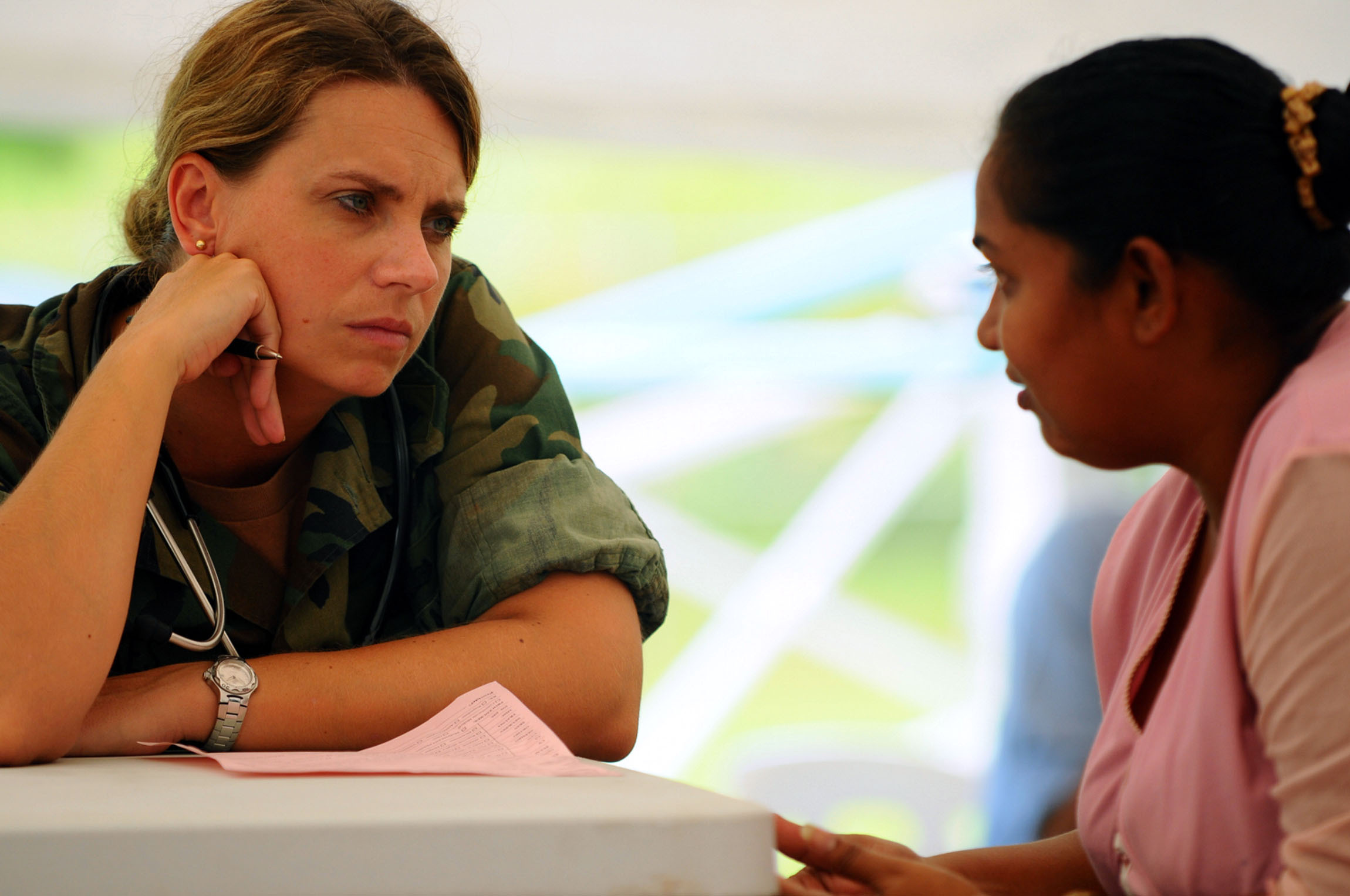
A key principle of Rogerian argument is listening carefully to another person empathetically enough to be able to state the other's position to the other's satisfaction.

Rogerian argument (or Rogerian rhetoric) is a rhetorical and conflict resolution strategy based on empathizing with others, seeking common ground and mutual understanding and learning, while avoiding the negative effects of extreme attitude polarization. The term Rogerian refers to the psychologist Carl Rogers, whose client-centered therapy has also been called Rogerian therapy. Since 1970, rhetoricians have applied the ideas of Rogers—with contributions by Anatol Rapoport—to rhetoric and argumentation, producing Rogerian argument.

A key principle of Rogerian argument is that, instead of advocating one's own position and trying to refute the other's position, one tries to state the other's position with as much care as one would have stated one's own position, emphasizing what is strong or valid in the other's argument. To this principle, Rapoport added other principles that are sometimes called "Rapoport's rules". Rhetoricians have designed various methods for applying these Rogerian rhetorical principles in practice.

Several scholars have criticized how Rogerian argument is taught. Already in the 1960s Rapoport had noted some of the limitations of Rogerian argument, and other scholars identified other limitations in the following decades. For example, they concluded that Rogerian argument is less likely to be appropriate or effective when communicating with violent or discriminatory people or institutions, in situations of social exclusion or extreme power inequality, or in judicial settings that use formal adversarial procedures.

Some empirical research has tested role reversal and found that its effectiveness depends on the issue and situation.

== Origin ==
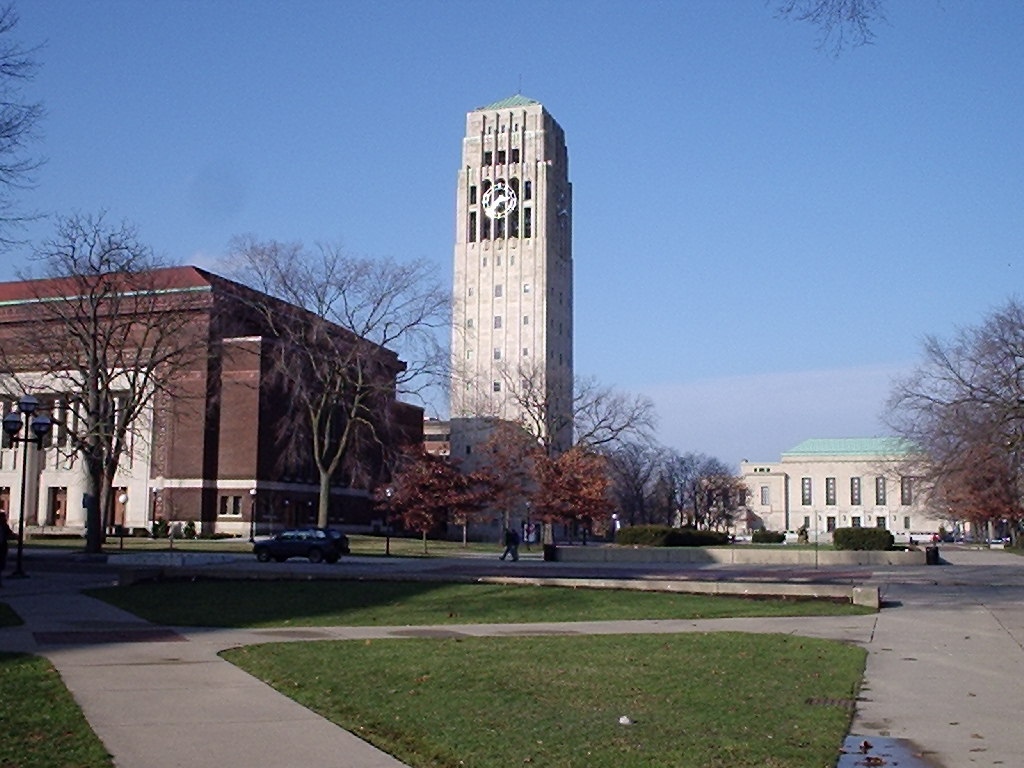
The University of Michigan is where Rogerian argument was given its name by Anatol Rapoport and others. In the 1960s, Rapoport had helped put Michigan's Mental Health Research Institute at the center of the use of game theory in psychological research. Rapoport came to Michigan from a position at the University of Chicago, where Carl Rogers was also a professor.

In the study and teaching of rhetoric and argumentation, the term Rogerian argument was popularized in the 1970s and 1980s by the 1970 textbook Rhetoric: Discovery and Change by the University of Michigan professors Richard E. Young, Alton L. Becker, and Kenneth L. Pike. They borrowed the term Rogerian and related ideas from the polymath Anatol Rapoport, who was working, and doing peace activism, at the same university. The University of Texas at Austin professor Maxine Hairston then spread Rogerian argument through publications such as her textbook A Contemporary Rhetoric, and other authors published book chapters and scholarly articles on the subject.

=== Rapoport's three ways of changing people ===
Anatol Rapoport's 1960 book Fights, Games, and Debates described three persuasive strategies that could be applied in debates. He noted that they correspond to three kinds of psychotherapy or ways of changing people, and he named them after Pavlov (behaviorism), Freud (psychoanalysis), and Rogers (person-centered therapy). Young, Becker, and Pike's 1970 textbook Rhetoric: Discovery and Change said that the strategies correspond to three big assumptions about humanity, which they called three "images of man".

==== Pavlovian strategy ====
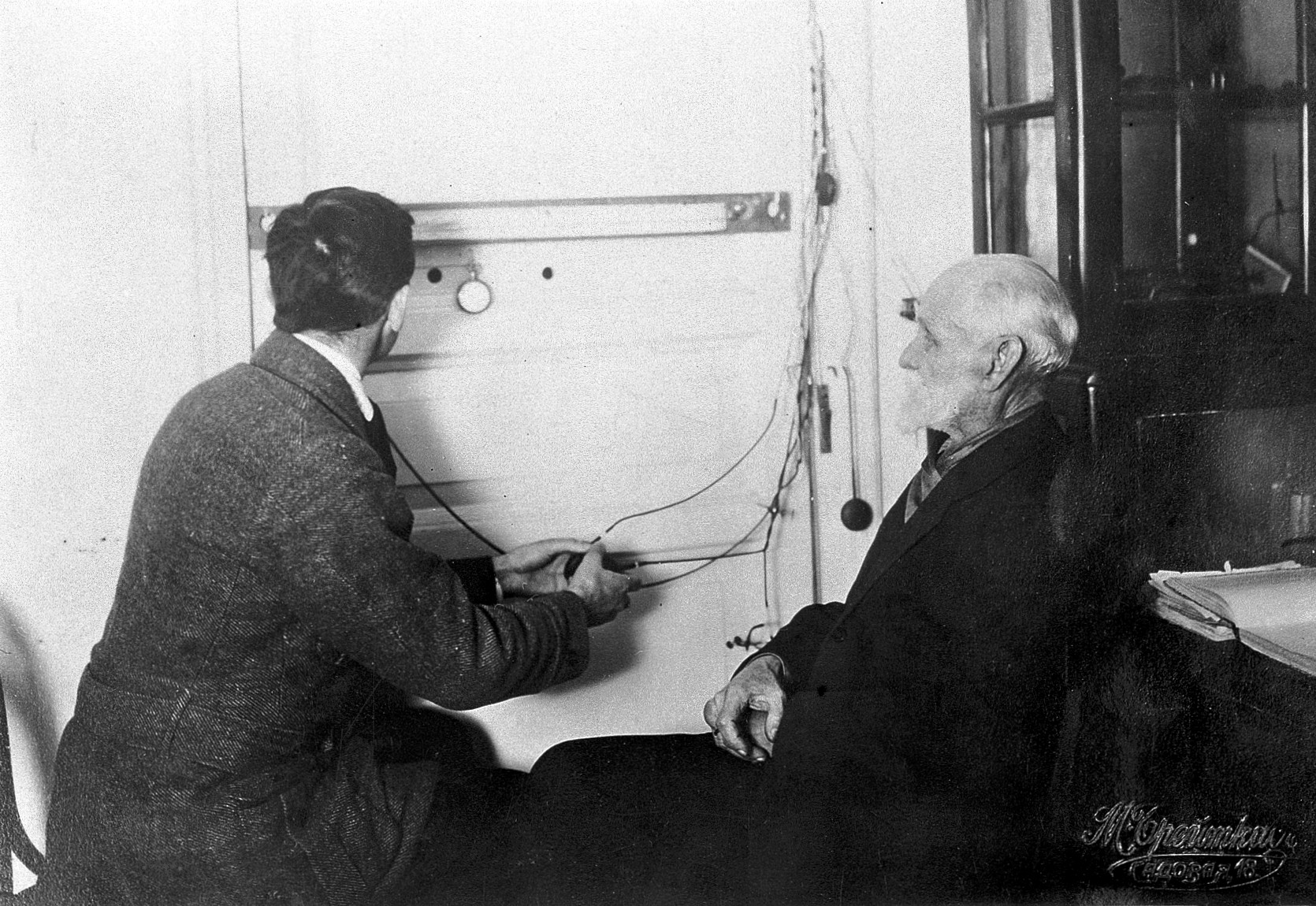
Pavlov, the Russian physiologist known for his experiments on dogs, inspired Rapoport's name for the Pavlovian strategy of controlling people through rewards and punishments.

The Pavlovian strategy represents people "as a bundle of habits that can be shaped and controlled" by punishments and rewards. This strategy changes people by punishing undesired habits and rewarding desired habits. Some examples of Pavlovian techniques in the real world are behaviorist teaching machines, training of simple skills, and brainwashing, which Rapoport called "another name for training". Some fictional examples cited by Rapoport are the inquisitors in Shaw's Saint Joan, in Koestler's Darkness at Noon, and in Orwell's 1984. The Pavlovian strategy can be benign or malign, but a "fundamental limitation" of the strategy is that the user of it must have complete control over the rewards and punishments used to change someone's mind and behavior, and someone in a conflict is unlikely to submit to such control by a perceived opponent, except under draconian conditions such as imprisonment.

==== Freudian strategy ====
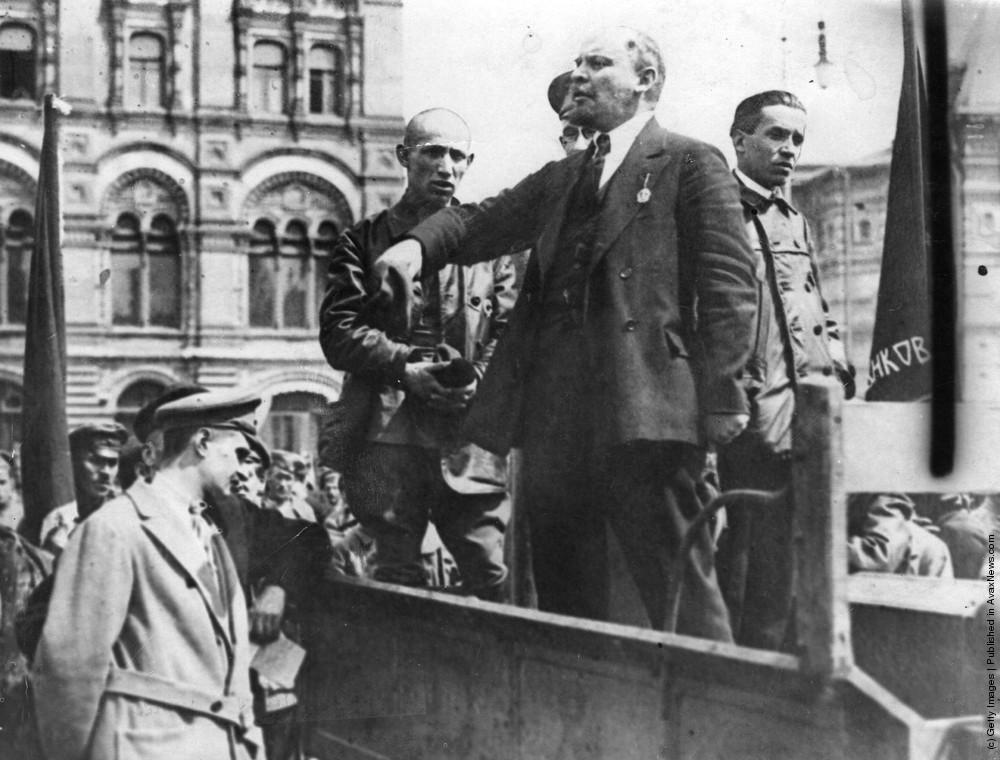
Lenin, the Russian revolutionary and political theorist: Rapoport called him a frequent user of the Freudian strategy of persuading people through "explaining away" their beliefs.

The Freudian strategy represents people as consciously espousing beliefs that are produced by unconscious or hidden motives that are unknown to them; changing people's beliefs—and changing any behaviors that are caused by those beliefs—requires revealing the hidden motives. Rapoport considered this strategy to be at the core of Freudian psychoanalysis but also to be present in any other kind of analysis that aims to change people's minds or behaviors by explaining how their beliefs or discourse are a product of hidden motives or mechanisms. Rapoport mentioned his own teaching as one example of this strategy, in situations where his students' resistance to new knowledge was dissolved by the teacher pointing out how the students' opposing preconceptions were caused by the students' memories of prior experiences that were illusory or irrelevant to the new knowledge. Another of Rapoport's examples was a certain kind of Marxist class analysis, used repeatedly by Lenin, in which the ideals of liberal intellectuals are "explained away" by Marxists as nothing more than a rationalization of the liberals' unconscious motive to preserve their social class position in a capitalist economic system. Such "explaining away" or "debunking" of people's beliefs and behaviors may work, Rapoport said, when there is "a complete trust placed by the target of persuasion in the persuader", as sometimes occurs in teaching and psychotherapy. But such complete trust is unlikely in most conflict situations, and the strategy can often be turned back against someone who is trying to use it: "It has been used by anti-Communists on the Communists (clothed in Freudian terminology) as well as by the Communists on the anti-Communists (clothed in Marxist terminology)."

==== Rogerian strategy ====
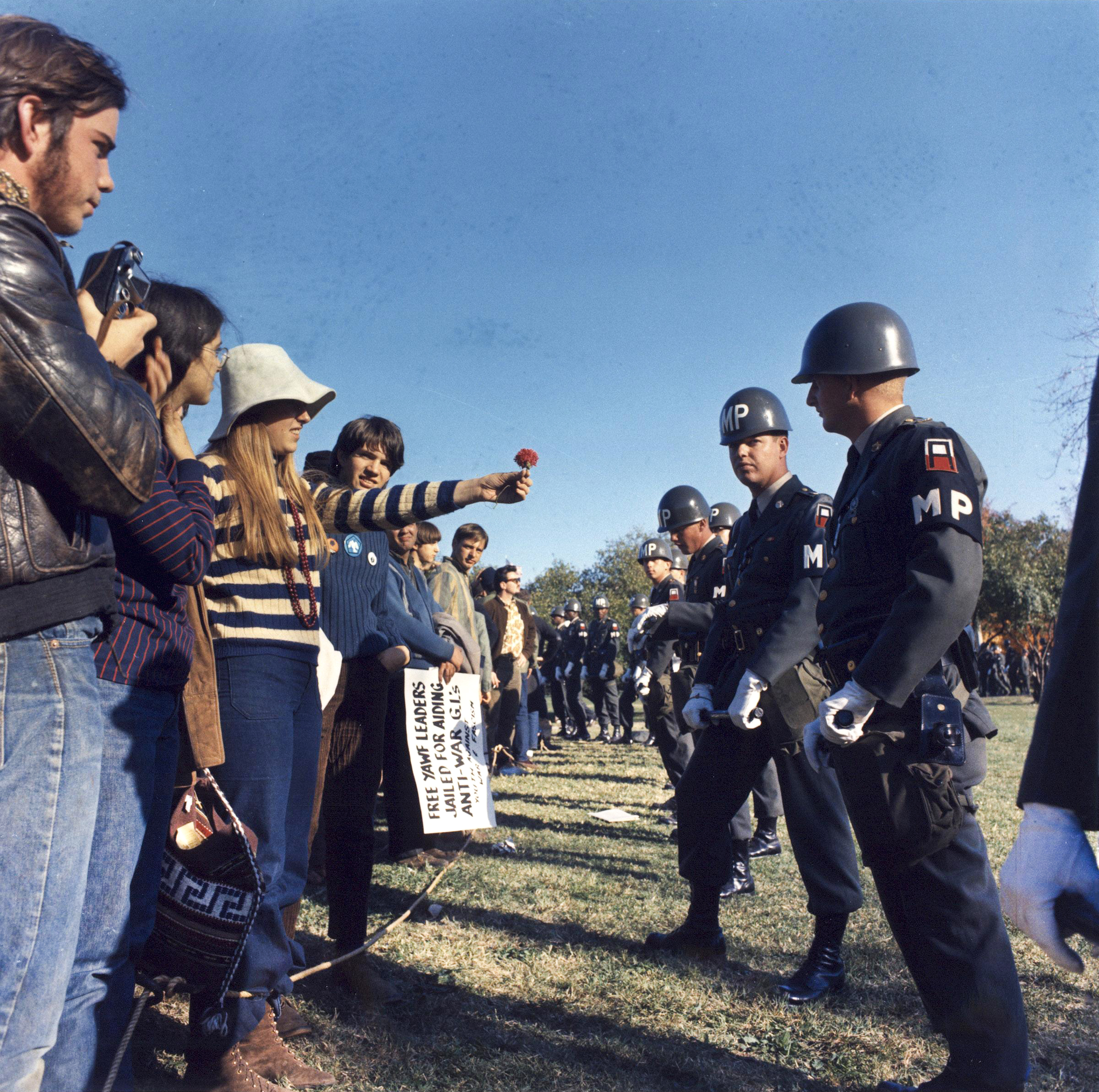
The removal of threat is what Rapoport called the Rogerian strategy of inviting people to consider the possibility of mutual learning and change by understanding and accepting them.

The Rogerian strategy represents people as usually trying to protect themselves from what they perceive to be threatening. This strategy invites people to consider the possibility of changing by removing the threat that the change implies. Rapoport noted that Freudian psychoanalysts often diagnose people's defenses against what is perceived to be threatening, since such defenses can be among the hidden motives that the Freudian strategy tries to uncover. But the Freudian strategy of changing someone's mind and behavior by explaining hidden motives will not work whenever a person perceives the explanation itself to be threatening in some way, as is likely to happen when the explanation comes from a perceived opponent in a conflict. There are many ways that someone's statements could be perceived, consciously or unconsciously, as threatening: for example, the other may perceive some statement as being aggressive to some degree, or even destructive of the other's entire worldview. To remove the threat requires trying not to impose one's own explanation or argument on the other in any way. Instead, the Rogerian strategy starts by "providing deep understanding and acceptance of the attitudes consciously held at this moment" by the other, and this attitude is not a subtle trick used to try to control or persuade the other; in the words of Rogers, "To be effective, it must be genuine." Rapoport suggested three principles that characterize the Rogerian strategy: listening and making the other feel understood, finding merit in the other's position, and increasing the perception of similarity between people.

=== Rogers on communication ===
A work by Carl Rogers that was especially influential in the formulation of Rogerian argument was his 1951 paper "Communication: Its Blocking and Its Facilitation", published in the same year as his book Client-Centered Therapy. Rogers began the paper by arguing that psychotherapy and communication are much more closely related than people might suspect, because psychotherapy is all about remedying failures in communication—where communication is defined as a process that happens both within a person as well as between people. For Rogers, the troubling conflict between a person's conscious and unconscious convictions that may require psychotherapy is similar to the troubling conflict between two people's convictions that may require mediation. Rogers proposed that effective psychotherapy always helps establish good communication, and good communication is always therapeutic. Rogers said that the major barrier to good communication between people is one's tendency to evaluate what other people say from within one's own usual point of view and way of thinking and feeling, instead of trying to understand what they say from within their point of view and way of thinking and feeling; the result is that people talk past each other instead of think together. If one accurately and sympathetically understands how others think and feel from inside, and if one communicates this understanding to them, then it frees others from feeling a need to defend themselves, and it changes one's own thinking and feeling to some degree, said Rogers. And if two people or two groups of people can do this for each other, it allows them "to come closer and closer to the objective truth involved in the relationship" and creates mutual good communication so that "some type of agreement becomes much more possible".

One idea that Rogers emphasized several times in his 1951 paper that is not mentioned in textbook treatments of Rogerian argument is third-party intervention. Rogers suggested that a neutral third party, instead of the parties to the conflict themselves, could in some cases present one party's sympathetic understanding of the other to the other.

Rogerian argument is an application of Rogers' ideas about communication, taught by rhetoric teachers who were inspired by Rapoport, but Rogers' ideas about communication have also been applied somewhat differently by many others: for example, Marshall Rosenberg created nonviolent communication, a process of conflict resolution and nonviolent living, after studying and working with Rogers, and other writing teachers used some of Rogers' ideas in developing expressivist theories of writing.

=== Relation to classical rhetoric ===
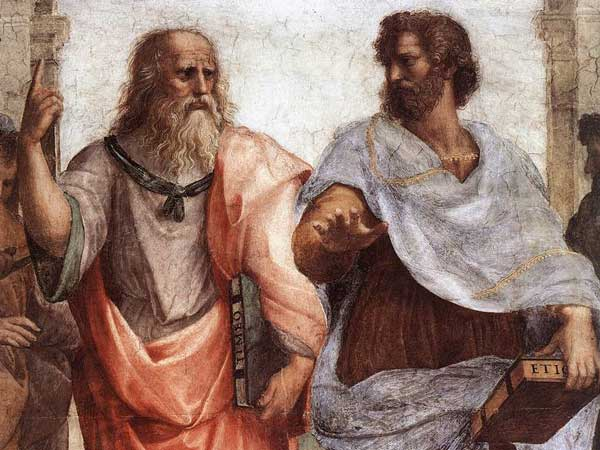
Scholars have compared Rogerian argument to some ideas of the classical Greek thinkers Plato and Aristotle.

There are different opinions about whether Rogerian rhetoric is like or unlike classical rhetoric from ancient Greece and Rome.

Young, Becker, and Pike said that classical rhetoric and Rapoport's Pavlovian strategy and Freudian strategy all share the common goal of controlling or persuading someone else, but the Rogerian strategy has different assumptions about humanity and a different goal. In Young, Becker, and Pike's view, the goal of Rogerian rhetoric is to remove the obstacles—especially the sense of threat—to cooperative communication, mutual understanding, and mutual intellectual growth. They considered this goal to be a new alternative to classical rhetoric. They also said that classical rhetoric is used both in dyadic situations—when two parties are trying to understand and change each other—and in triadic situations—when one party is responding to an opponent but is trying to influence a third party such as an arbitrator or jury or public opinion—but Rogerian rhetoric is specially intended for certain dyadic situations, not for triadic situations.

English professor Andrea Lunsford, responding to Young, Becker, and Pike in a 1979 article, argued that the three principles of Rogerian strategy that they borrowed from Rapoport could be found in various parts of Aristotle's writings, and so were already in the classical tradition. She pointed to Book I of Aristotle's Rhetoric where he said that one must be able to understand and argue both sides of an issue, and to his discussions of friendship and of the enthymeme in Book II, and to similar passages in his Topics. She also saw some similarity to Plato's Phaedrus. Other scholars have also found resonances between Rogerian and Platonic "rhetorics of dialogue".

English professor Paul G. Bator argued in 1980 that Rogerian argument is more different from Aristotle's rhetoric than Lunsford had concluded. Among the differences he noted: the Aristotelian rhetor (orator) portrays a certain character (ethos) to try to persuade the audience to the rhetor's point of view, whereas the Rogerian rhetor listens not to "ingratiate herself" but to genuinely understand and accept the other's point of view and to communicate that understanding and acceptance; the Aristotelian rhetor has a predetermined intention to win over the opposition, whereas the Rogerian rhetor has an open-ended intention to facilitate change through mutual understanding and cooperation; the Aristotelian rhetor may or may not explicitly acknowledge the opponent's position, whereas for the Rogerian rhetor an accurate and sympathetic statement of the other's position is essential.

Professor of communication Douglas Brent said that Rogerian rhetoric is not the captatio benevolentiae (securing of good will) taught by Cicero and later by medieval rhetoricians. Brent said that superficially confusing the Rogerian strategy with such ingratiation overlooks "the therapeutic roots of Rogers' philosophy", rhetoric's power to heal both speakers and listeners, and the importance of "genuine grounds of shared understanding, not just as a precursor to an 'effective' argument, but as a means of engaging in effective knowledge-making".

== Rapoport's rules ==
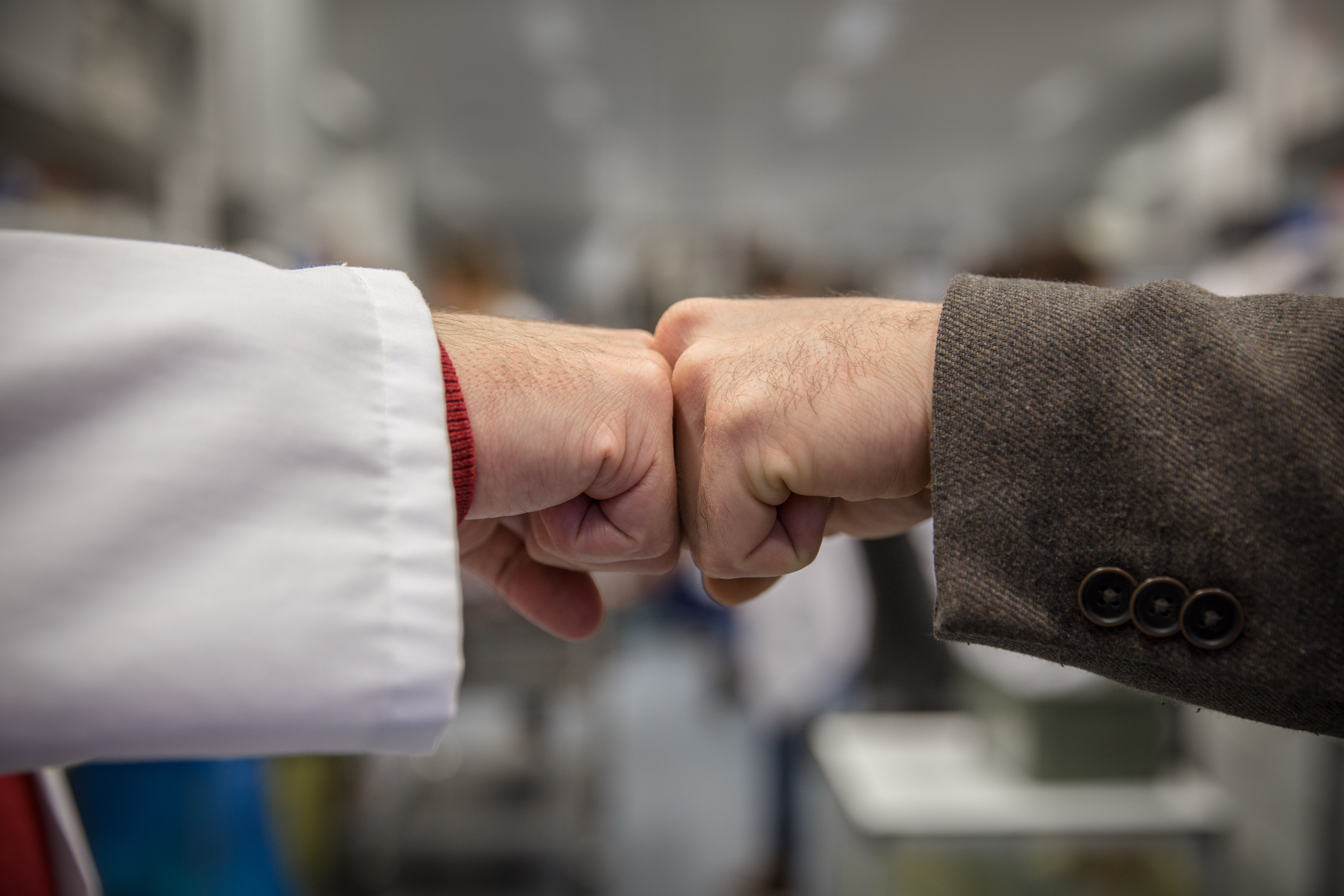
Rapoport's three principles of ethical debate are: listening and making the other feel understood, finding merit in the other's position, and increasing the perception of similarity: "we are all in the same boat".

By the end of the 1960s, the term Rapoport debate was used to refer to what Anatol Rapoport called ethical debate, which is debate guided by Rapoport's Rogerian strategy. Philosopher Daniel Dennett, in his 2013 book Intuition Pumps and Other Tools for Thinking, called these principles Rapoport's rules of debate, a term that other authors have since adopted.

Rapoport proposed three main principles of ethical debate:

1. Listening and making the other feel understood has two parts: First, listening by example, which Rapoport attributed to S. I. Hayakawa, is listening to others so that they will be willing to listen as well. Second, role reversal, which Rapoport attributed to Carl Rogers, is listening carefully and empathetically enough to be able to state the other's position to the other's satisfaction, and vice versa. Rapoport called this principle "conveying to the opponent that he has been heard and understood", and he noted that it is the main component of Rogers's nondirective client-centered therapy.
2. Finding some merit in the other's position, or what Rapoport called "delineating the region of validity of the opponent's stand", is the opposite of the usual intent in a debate, the usual intent being to refute or invalidate the other's position. Most opinions can be partly justified in some circumstances from some perspective, so the aim should be to identify what is conditionally justifiable in the other's position and to give examples that support it. It is implied, but not stated, that the other's position is not strong or valid in some other circumstances outside of the identified "region of validity". This second principle reinforces the first principle by communicating to the other in a new way that the other has been heard and understood. It also implies some agreement and common ground between the two positions, while contributing toward a better understanding of the area of disagreement. Furthermore, acknowledging that there is some merit in the other's position may make one more willing to re-examine one's own position and perhaps find some part of it that is not strong or valid in some way, which ultimately may lead "away from the primitive level of verbal opposition to deeper levels where searching investigation is encouraged", perhaps leading to larger field of view with a larger region of validity.
3. Increasing perceived similarity is a deepening of the sense of common humanity between self and other, a sense of shared strengths and flaws. Like the second principle, this third principle is the opposite of what is usual in a debate, the usual perception being that the other is different in an inferior way, such as more "stupid or rigid or dishonest or ruthless". Instead of emphasizing the uniqueness of the flaws of the other, "one seeks within oneself the clearly perceived shortcomings of the opponent", and instead of emphasizing the uniqueness of one's own strengths (such as intelligence, honesty, and conscientiousness), one asks how the other shares such qualities to some degree. Rapoport considered this "assumption of similarity" to be "the psychological set [or mindset] conducive to conflict resolution". An obstacle that prevents people from making the assumption of similarity is the notion "that such an assumption is evidence of [a debater's] professional incompetence". But that notion is counterproductive, Rapoport argued, because the assumption of similarity, together with the other two principles, is likely to remove obstacles to cooperation and to successful debate outcomes. Rapoport said: "The outcome depends on the occurrence of one crucial insight: we are all in the same boat."

=== Dennett's version ===
Daniel Dennett's version of Rapoport's rules, which Dennett considered to be "somewhat more portable and versatile", is:

1. "You should attempt to re-express your target's position so clearly, vividly, and fairly that your target says, 'Thanks, I wish I'd thought of putting it that way.'"
2. "You should list any points of agreement (especially if they are not matters of general or widespread agreement)."
3. "You should mention anything you have learned from your target."
4. "Only then are you permitted to say so much as a word of rebuttal or criticism."

Dennett's other advice, in his presentation of Rapoport's rules, had more of an adversarial outlook than a Rogerian one: he said that some people "don't deserve such respectful attention" and that he found it to "be sheer joy to skewer and roast" such people. In contrast to Rogers' attitude of consistently "providing deep understanding and acceptance of the attitudes consciously held at this moment" by the other, Dennett advised: "If there are obvious contradictions in the opponent's case, then of course you should point them out, forcefully. If there are somewhat hidden contradictions, you should carefully expose them to view—and then dump on them." Although Dennett personally found Rapoport's rules to be "something of a struggle" to practice, he called the rules a strong antidote for the tendency to uncharitably caricature someone else's position in a debate.

In a summary of Dennett's version of Rapoport's rules, Peter Boghossian and James A. Lindsay pointed out that an important part of how Rapoport's rules work is by modeling prosocial behavior: one party demonstrates respect and intellectual openness so that the other party can emulate those characteristics, which would be less likely to occur in intensely adversarial conditions.

=== Relation to game theory ===
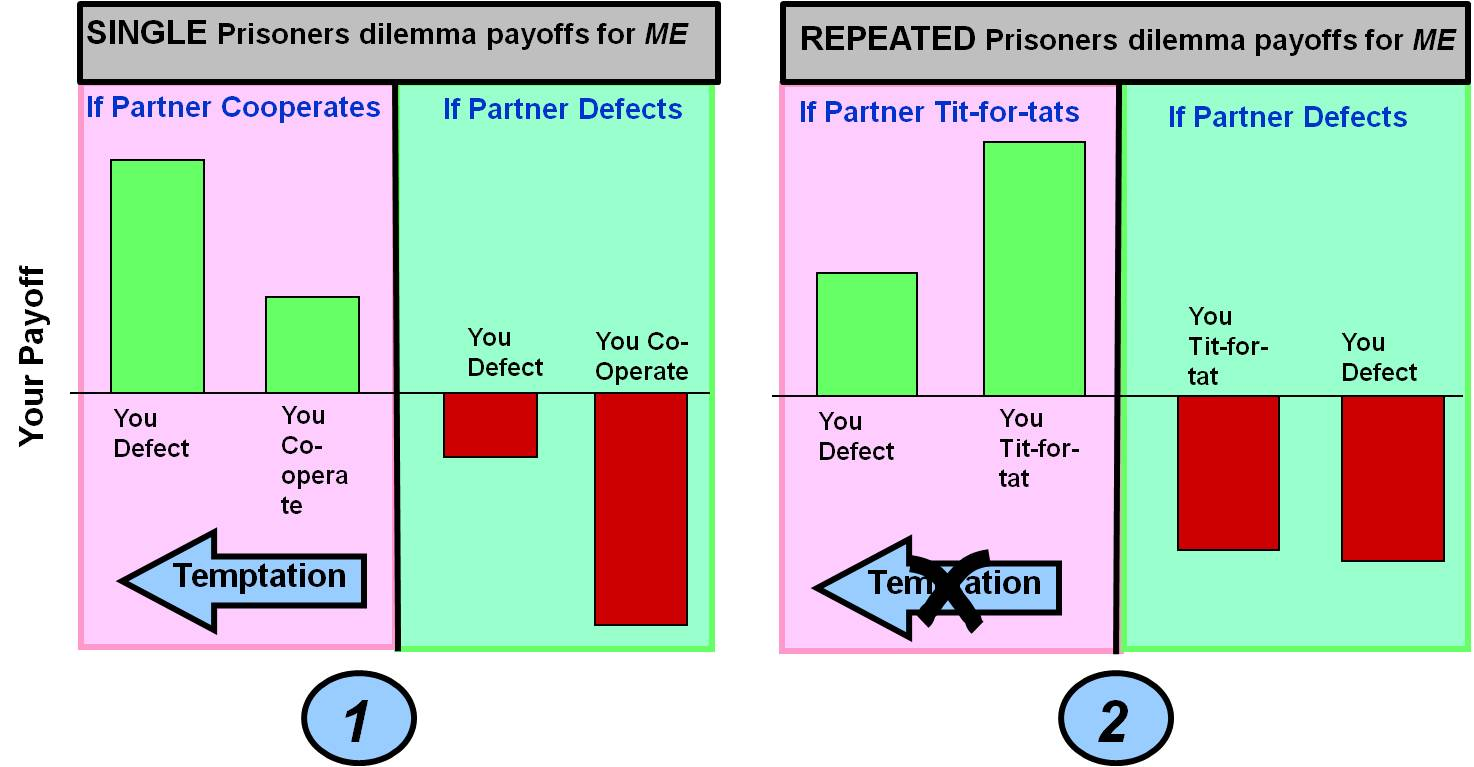
Rapoport's tit-for-tat computer algorithm maximized mutually rewarding outcomes in repeated prisoner's dilemma games around 1980.

English professor Michael Austin, in his 2019 book We Must Not Be Enemies, pointed out the connection between Rapoport's three principles of ethical debate, published in 1960, and Rapoport's tit-for-tat algorithm that won political scientist Robert Axelrod's repeated prisoner's dilemma computer tournaments around 1980. Austin summarized Axelrod's conclusion that Rapoport's tit-for-tat algorithm won those tournaments because it was (in a technical sense) nice, forgiving, not envious, and absolutely predictable. With these characteristics, tit-for-tat elicited mutually rewarding outcomes more than any of the competing algorithms did over many automated repetitions of the prisoner's dilemma game.

In the 1950s, R. Duncan Luce had introduced Rapoport to the prisoner's dilemma game, a kind of non-zero-sum game. Rapoport proceeded to publish a landmark 1965 book of empirical psychological research using the game, followed by another book in 1976 on empirical research about seventy-eight 2 × 2 two-person non-zero-sum games. All this research had prepared Rapoport to understand, perhaps better than anyone else at the time, the best ways to win non-zero-sum games such as Axelrod's tournaments.

Rapoport himself, in his 1960 discussion of the Rogerian strategy in Fights, Games, and Debates, connected the ethics of debate to non-zero-sum games. Rapoport distinguished three hierarchical levels of conflict:

1. fights are unthinking and persistent aggression against an opponent "motivated only by mutual animosity or mutual fear";
2. games are attempts "to outwit the opponent" by achieving the best possible outcome within certain shared rules;
3. debates are verbal conflicts about the convictions of the opponents, each of whom aims "to convince the opponent".

Rapoport pointed out "that a rigorous examination of game-like conflict leads inevitably" to the examination of debates, because "strictly rigorous game theory when extrapolated to cover other than two-person zero-sum games" requires consideration of issues such as "communication theory, psychology, even ethics" that are beyond simple game-like rules. He also suggested that the international affairs experts of the time were facing situations analogous to the prisoner's dilemma, but the experts often appeared incapable of taking actions, such as those recommended by Rapoport's three principles of ethical debate, that would allow the opponents to reach a mutually advantageous outcome.

Austin said that the characteristics that Rapoport programmed into the tit-for-tat algorithm are similar to Rapoport's three principles of ethical debate: both tit-for-tat and Rapoport's rules of debate are guidelines for producing a beneficial outcome in certain "non-zero-sum" situations. Both invite the other to reciprocate with cooperative behavior, creating an environment that makes cooperation and mutuality more profitable in the long run than antagonism and unilaterally trying to beat the opponent.

== In practice ==
=== In informal oral communication ===
In informal oral communication, Rogerian argument must be flexible because others can interject and show that one has failed to state their position and situation adequately, and then one must modify one's previous statements before continuing, resulting in an unpredictable sequence of conversation that is guided by the general principles of Rogerian strategy.

Carl Rogers himself was primarily interested in spontaneous oral communication, and Douglas Brent considered the "native" mode of Rogerian communication to be mutual exploration of an issue through face-to-face oral communication. Whenever Brent taught the Rogerian attitude, he recommended to his students that before trying to write in a Rogerian way, they should first "practice on real, present people in a context more like the original therapeutic situations for which Rogerian principles were originally designed".

=== In formal written communication ===
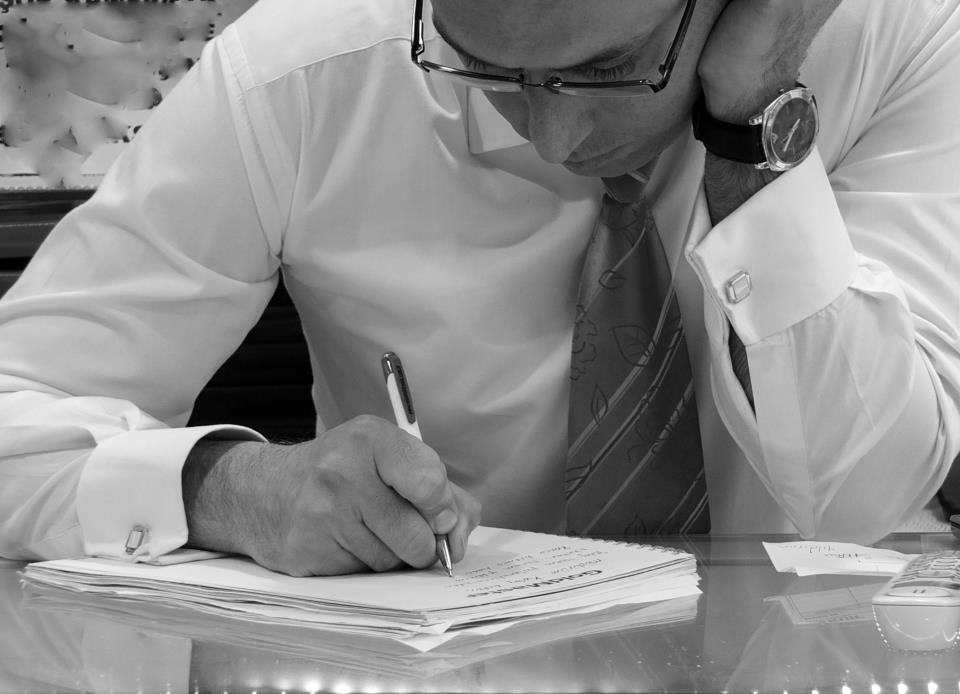
Formal written communication requires a different approach to Rogerian argument due to differences from oral communication such as lack of immediate feedback from the other person.

In formal written communication that addresses the reader, the use of Rogerian argument requires sufficient knowledge of the audience, through prior acquaintance or audience analysis, to be able to present the reader's perspective accurately and respond to it appropriately. Since formal written communication lacks the immediate feedback from the other and the unpredictable sequence found in oral communication, and can use a more predictable approach, Young, Becker, and Pike proposed four phases that a writer could use to construct a written Rogerian argument:

1. "An introduction to the problem and a demonstration that the opponent's position is understood."
2. "A statement of the contexts in which the opponent's position may be valid."
3. "A statement of the writer's position, including the contexts in which it is valid."
4. "A statement of how the opponent's position would benefit if he were to adopt elements of the writer's position. If the writer can show that the positions complement each other, that each supplies what the other lacks, so much the better."

The first two of Young, Becker, and Pike's four phases of written Rogerian argument are based on the first two of Rapoport's three principles of ethical debate. The third of Rapoport's principles—increasing the perceived similarity between self and other—is a principle that Young, Becker, and Pike considered to be equally as important as the other two, but they said it should be an attitude assumed throughout the discourse and is not a phase of writing.

Maxine Hairston, in a section on "Rogerian or nonthreatening argument" in her textbook A Contemporary Rhetoric, advised that one "shouldn't start writing with a detailed plan in mind" but might start by making four lists: the other's concerns, one's own key points, anticipated problems, and points of agreement or common ground. She gave a different version of Young, Becker, and Pike's four phases, which she expanded to five and called "elements of the nonthreatening argument": a brief and objective statement of the issue; a neutrally worded analysis of the other's position; a neutrally worded analysis of one's own position; a statement of the common aspects, goals, and values that the positions share; and a proposal for resolving the issue that shows how both sides may gain. She said that the Rogerian approach requires calm, patience, and effort, and will work if one is "more concerned about increasing understanding and communication" than "about scoring a triumph". In a related article, she noted the similarity between Rogerian argument and John Stuart Mill's well-known phrase from On Liberty: "He who knows only his own side of the case knows little of that."

Robert Keith Miller's textbook The Informed Argument, first published in 1986, presented five phases adapted from an earlier textbook by Richard Coe. Miller's phases were: an introduction to the problem; a summary of views that oppose the writer's position; a statement of understanding of the region of validity of the opposing views; a statement of the writer's position; a statement of the situations in which the writer's position has merit; and a statement of the benefits of accepting the writer's position.

In 1992, Rebecca Stephens built on the "vague and abstract" Rogerian principles of other rhetoricians to create a set of 23 "concrete and detailed" questions that she called a Rogerian-based heuristic for rhetorical invention, intended to help people think in a Rogerian way while discovering ideas and arguments. For example, the first two of her 23 questions are "What is the nature of the issue, in general terms?" (and she recommended that the answer should itself be stated as a question) and "Whose lives are affected by the issue?" The last two questions are "What would have to happen to eliminate the disagreement among the opposing groups?" and "What are the chances that this will occur?"

=== Ede's critique ===
Lisa Ede, a writing professor at Oregon State University, argued in a 1984 article—referring especially to some of the ideas of Young, Becker, and Pike—that "Rogerian rhetoric is not Rogerian" but is instead a distortion of Carl Rogers' ideas. First, she criticized Young, Becker, and Pike for the inconsistency of suggesting that "Rogerian argument has no conventional structure" while at the same time they proposed four phases of writing that "look suspiciously like" a conventional adversarial structure. She noted that Hairston's fifth phase of written Rogerian argument, a proposal for resolving the issue that shows how both sides may gain, "brings Rogerian rhetoric even closer to traditional argument". Second, she judged that Young, Becker, and Pike underemphasized Rogers' unconditional acceptance of the other person and that they overemphasized advocacy of the writer's position, which is not part of Rogers' recommended practice. Third, she found their description of the empathy required in Rogerian rhetoric to be no more than conventional audience analysis, which she considered to be much weaker than Rogers' more demanding description of empathy as standing in the other's shoes and seeing the world from the other's standpoint. She said that Rogers' principles of congruence, unconditional acceptance of the other, and empathic understanding must be "deeply internalized or they become mere techniques", and she doubted whether the teaching of these principles in writing education had ever been successfully accomplished.

Ede argued in 1987 that Young, Becker, and Pike's Rogerian rhetoric is weak compared to what she considered to be the "much more sophisticated" 20th-century rhetorics found in Kenneth Burke's A Grammar of Motives and Chaïm Perelman's The Realm of Rhetoric. In her view, it is "not parsimonious" to coin the new term Rogerian rhetoric to refer to ideas that can already be found elsewhere in rhetorical theory.

Young responded to Ede that he did not know of any previous treatment in rhetorical theory of the kind of situation that Rogerian argument tries to address, where the techniques of the classical rhetorical tradition are likely to create or intensify extreme opposition, and where a deeper communication—of the kind that Rogers taught—is needed between and within people. Young later admitted that the first presentation of Rogerian argument in his 1970 textbook "may have been flawed", but he thought that Rogerian argument could still be valuable "if it were modified in light of what we know now". Young admitted, speaking for himself and his 1970 coauthors:

We did not pay enough attention to the considerable variation in actual dyadic situations; and we did not see that both the use and the usefulness of Rogerian argument seem to vary as the situation varies. The peculiarities of the particular situation affect, or should affect, the choices one makes in addressing it; not understanding this leads to inappropriate and ineffective choices.

=== Limitations ===
Scholars debating Rogerian argument often noted limitations of the scope within which the Rogerian strategy is likely to be appropriate or effective.

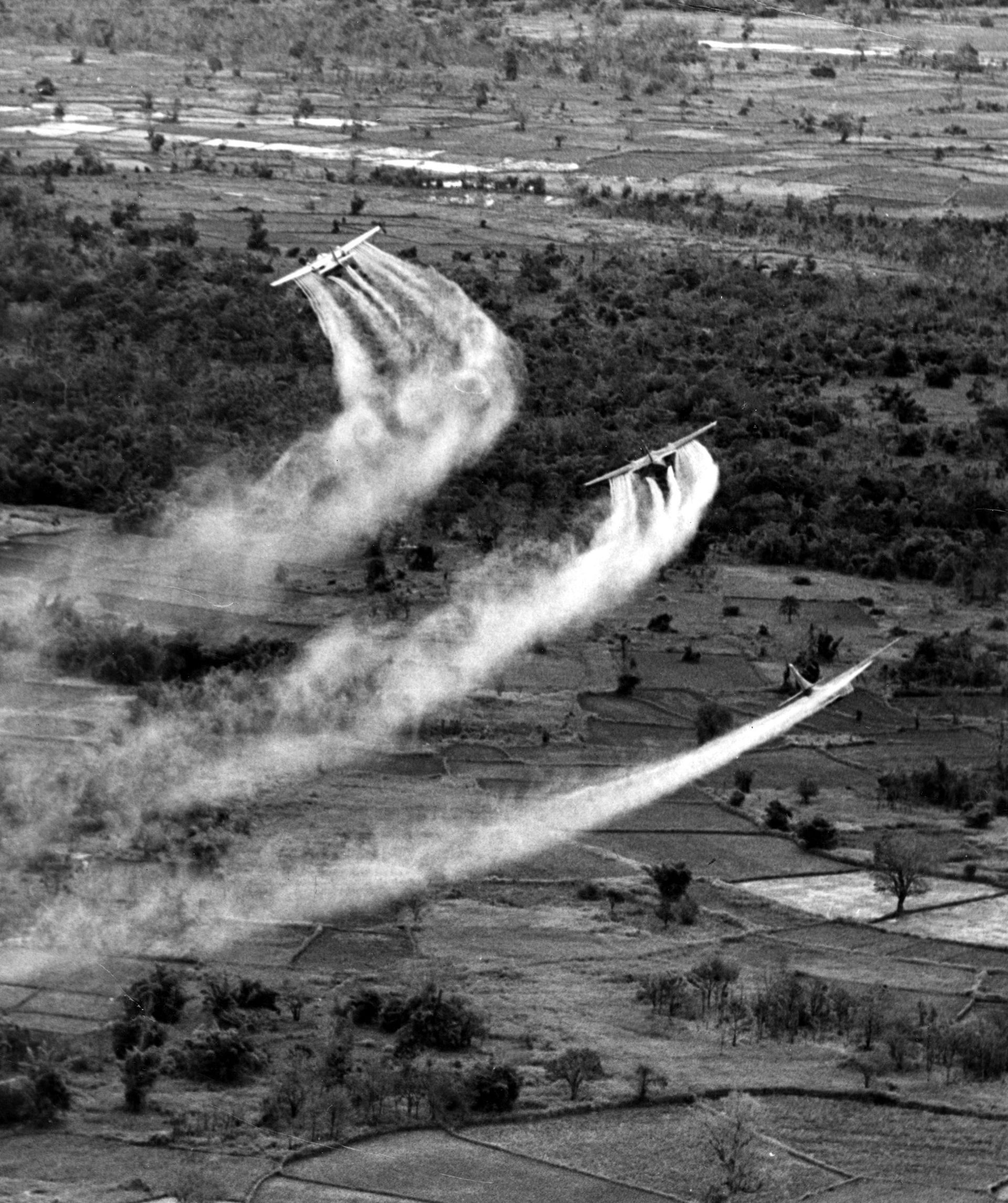
Rapoport pointed out that farmers could not practice a Rogerian approach with the military pilot who was spraying Agent Orange and strafing them with bullets from the sky. Rogerian argument is ineffective with someone who is only functioning as a cog in an impersonal machine.

In a 1968 paper that Anatol Rapoport wrote during, and in response to, the Vietnam War, he noted that the Rogerian approach was mostly irrelevant to the task of opposition to United States involvement in the Vietnam War. Earlier, Rapoport had suggested that an "ethical debate between liberalism and communism, to be conducted according to the rules of role reversal, along lines proposed earlier by Carl Rogers" could help resolve conflict between the United States and communist states. He had previously imagined that an earlier phase of the conflict was "largely a communication problem, one that could be attacked by 'men of good will' on both sides". But he concluded that the Rogerian approach does not apply to situations such as the Vietnam War when it is "impossible to communicate" in a Rogerian way with "the beast, Status belligerens", a war-making state such as the Lyndon Johnson administration. Rapoport noted: "Just as every proposition has a circumscribed region of validity, so does every method." (Soon after, in opposition to Status belligerens, Rapoport relocated permanently to Canada from the United States, leaving behind research connections with the military that he had since the 1940s.)

Young, Becker, and Pike pointed out in 1970 that Rogerian argument would be out of place in the typical mandated adversarial criminal procedures of the court system in the United States.

Ede noted in 1984 that the rhetoric textbooks that discussed Rogerian argument dedicated only a few pages to it out of a total of hundreds of pages, so the Rogerian approach is only a small part of theories of rhetoric and argumentation.

==== Feminist perspectives ====
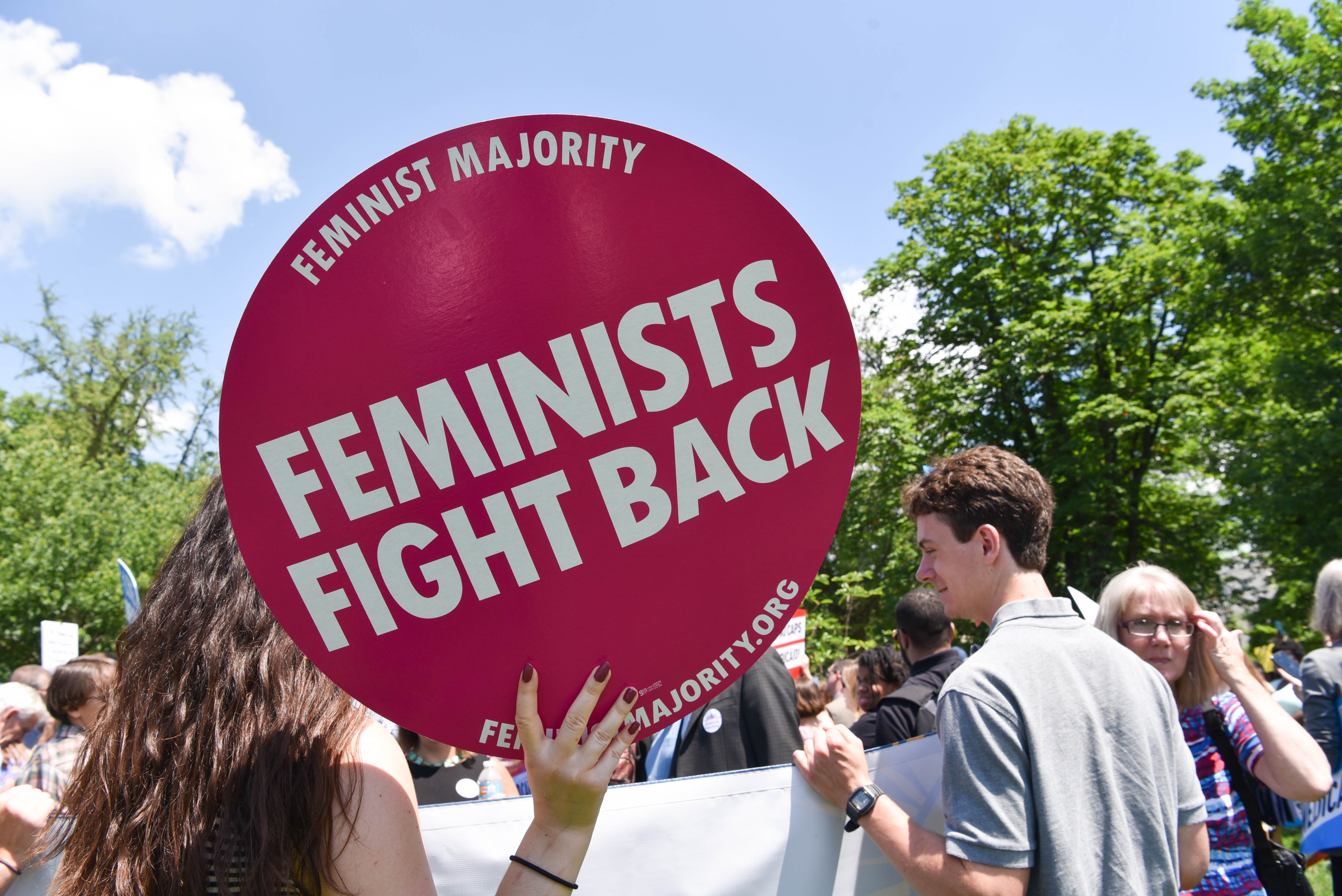
Some feminists argued: "Rogerian argument has always felt too much like giving in."

In a 1990 article that combined ideas from feminist theorists and testimonies from women college students in the 1980s, women's studies professor Phyllis Lassner identified some limitations of Rogerian argument from women's perspectives. One of Lassner's students "hated" Rogerian argument because "women have a right to be angry" and "everyone needs to know how they feel". Lassner said that Rogers' psychology "is socially constructed on a foundation of cultural hegemony". For women who are marginalized and have been taught that they are not "worthy opponents", Lassner said, "Rogerian rhetoric can be just as inhibiting and constraining as any other form of argumentation." Some of Lassner's students doubted that their opponent (such as an anti-gay or anti-abortion advocate) could even recognize them or could conceal repugnance and rejection of them enough to make Rogerian empathy possible. Lassner and her students especially disapproved of Hairston's advice to use neutrally worded statements, and they said that Hairston's ideal of neutrality was too "self-effacing" and "replicates a history of suppression" of women's voices and of their "authentic feeling".

In a 1991 article, English professor Catherine Lamb agreed with Lassner and added: "Rogerian argument has always felt too much like giving in." Lamb said that women (and men) need to have a theory of power and use it to evaluate alternative ways of communicating. Lamb considered more recent negotiation theory such as Getting to Yes to be more complete than Rogers' earlier ideas about communication (although there was Rogerian influence on Getting to Yes), and she used negotiation theory in her writing classes. In one of her class exercises, students worked in groups of three, role-playing three positions: two disputants in conflict and a third-party mediator. The disputants wrote memos to the mediator, the mediator wrote a memo to a supervisor, and then all three worked together to write a mediation agreement, which was discussed with the teacher. Subsequently, a somewhat similar class exercise was included in later editions of Nancy Wood's textbook Perspectives on Argument, in a chapter on Rogerian argument.

Young noted in 1992 that one potential problem with Rogerian argument is that people need it most when they may be least inclined to use it: when mutual antagonistic feelings between two people are most intense. The way Rogerian argument had been taught in rhetoric textbooks may be effective for some situations, Young said, but is unlikely to work between two parties in the kind of situation when they need it most, when they are most intractably opposed. Young suggested that third-party mediation, suggested by Rogers himself in 1951, may be most promising in that kind of situation.

== Related research on role reversal ==
Conflict researchers such as Morton Deutsch and David W. Johnson, citing the same publications by Rapoport and Rogers that inspired Rogerian rhetoric, used the term role reversal to refer to the presentation by one person to another person of the other person's position and vice versa. Deutsch, Johnson, and others have done empirical research on this kind of role reversal (mostly in the late 1960s and 1970s), and the results suggested that the effectiveness of role reversal—in achieving desired outcomes such as better understanding of opponents' positions, change in opponents' positions, or negotiated agreement—depends on the issue and situation.

Negotiation expert William Ury said in his 1999 book The Third Side that role reversal as a formal rule of argumentation has been used at least since the Middle Ages in the Western world: "Another rule dates back at least as far as the Middle Ages, when theologians at the University of Paris used it to facilitate mutual understanding: One can speak only after one has repeated what the other side has said to that person's satisfaction." Ury listed such role reversal among a variety of other tools that are useful for conflict mediation, some of which may be more appropriate than role reversal in certain situations. A kind of role reversal also featured among the advice in Getting to Yes, the self-help book on negotiation written by Ury and Roger Fisher, along with that book's Rogerian-like emphasis on identifying common concerns between opposing parties in a conflict.

== See also ==
- Argumentation theory § Types of dialogue
- Arne Næss § Recommendations for public debate
- Bohm Dialogue
- Civil discourse
- Cognitive bias modification
- Conflict continuum
- Dialectical thinking
- Dialogue
- Dialogue mapping
- Emotional validation
- Epistemic humility
- Epistemic virtue
- Group dynamics
- Immunity to change
- Interpersonal communication
- Intergroup dialogue
- Peace psychology
- Perspective-taking
- Philosophy of dialogue
- Reciprocal altruism
- Theories of rhetoric and composition pedagogy
