= Sheila Heen =

American author

- Born: Des Moines, Iowa, United States
- Occupations: Founder of Triad Consulting Group, Author, Educator, Public Speaker
- Spouse: John Richardson (m. 1994 - present)
- Children: 3

Academic background
- Education: Occidental College, Harvard Law School

Academic work
- Discipline: Law
- Sub-discipline: Negotiation, Conflict Resolution
- Institutions: Harvard Law School, Harvard Negotiation Project, Triad Consulting Group
- Website: https://www.triadconsultinggroup.com/

Sheila Heen is an American author, educator and public speaker. She is the Thaddeus R. Beal Professor of Practice at Harvard Law School, member of the Harvard Negotiation Project, and co-founder of Triad Consulting Group - a consultancy that helps executives and teams navigate high-stakes and Difficult Conversations™. She also authored two New York Times Best Sellers - Difficult Conversations: How to Discuss What Matters Most, and Thanks for the Feedback: The Science and Art of Receiving Feedback Well. At Harvard, Sheila teaches negotiation and conflict management.

== Biography ==
She received her B.A. from Occidental College and her J.D. from Harvard Law School. Upon graduating law school, Heen joined the Harvard Negotiation Project in 1993 to focus on negotiation theory for practitioners. She married John Richardson in 1994. She is co-founder of Triad Consulting Group, a global corporate education and communication consulting firm. Her book with Douglas Stone and Bruce Patton, Difficult Conversations: How to Discuss What Matters Most (Penguin 2000) expands on the problem-solving approach set forth in Getting to Yes.

== Awards ==
- Difficult Conversations: How to Discuss What Matters Most by Stone, Patton & Heen has been named one of 50 psychology Classics.
- Thanks for the Feedback: the Science and Art of Receiving Feedback Well by Stone & Heen won the 2015 Book for a Better Life Award.
