= Strategic Negotiations =

1994 book by Richard Walton

Strategic Negotiations: A Theory of change in Labor-Management Relations
- Author: Richard E. Walton, Joel Cutcher-Gershenfeld, and Robert McKersie
- Language: English
- Subject: Business
- Published: 23 August 1994 Harvard Business School Press
- Publication place: United States
- Pages: 400

Strategic Negotiations: A Theory of Change in Labor-Management Relations, a 1994 Harvard Business School Press publication, is a book on negotiation by the authors; Richard E. Walton, Joel Cutcher-Gershenfeld, and Robert McKersie.

The book explains concepts and strategies of negotiation to the reader.

== Summary ==
In the book, the authors identify three primary negotiation strategies. These are "forcing," "fostering," and "escape". Each represents an overarching pattern of interaction that characterizes the negotiations. A strategy does not emerge all at once, but over time as a result of consistent patterns of interaction.

A forcing strategy generally involves taking a "distributive" or win–lose approach to the negotiations, combined with a "divide and conquer" approach to internal relations in the other side, and an attitudinal approach that emphasizes uncertainty and distrust. By contrast, a fostering strategy generally involves taking an "integrative" or win-win approach to the negotiations, combined with a "consensus" approach to internal relations in both sides, and an attitudinal approach that emphasizes openness and understanding. "Escape" is a non-negotiation strategy in which one or more parties seek to end or undercut the relationship, which leads to a loss-loss situation.

These strategy and process elements of negotiations can be combined with an understanding of structure in order to predict outcomes that are both substantive and relationship outcomes.

== See also ==
- Conflict resolution
- List of books about negotiation
- Negotiation theory
