= Rogerian =

Rogerian may refer to:

- Rogerian argument, a conflict solving technique
- Rogerian psychotherapy, one of the major school groups of person-centered psychotherapy
