= Getting to Yes =

1981 book about negotiation methods by Roger Fisher

Getting to YES
- Author: Roger Fisher and William Ury; and Bruce Patton in 2nd and 3rd editions
- Language: English
- Publisher: Houghton Mifflin
- Publication date: 1981 (2nd ed. 1991, 3rd ed. 2011)
- Publication place: United States
- Media type: Print, e-book
- Pages: 200
- ISBN: 978-0-395-31757-0
- Dewey Decimal: 158.5
- LC Class: BF637.N4

Getting to Yes: Negotiating Agreement Without Giving In is a best-selling 1981 non-fiction book by Roger Fisher and William Ury. Subsequent editions in 1991 and 2011 added Bruce Patton as co-author. All of the authors were members of the Harvard Negotiation Project.

The book suggests a method of principled negotiation consisting of "separate the people from the problem"; "focus on interests, not positions"; "invent options for mutual gain"; and "insist on using objective criteria". Although influential in the field of negotiation, the book has received criticisms.

== Background ==
Fisher and Ury focused on the psychology of negotiation in their method, "principled negotiation", which attempts to find acceptable solutions by determining which needs are fixed and which are flexible for negotiators. The first edition of the book was published in 1981. By 1987, the book had been adopted in several U.S. school districts to help students understand "non-adversarial bargaining".

In 1991, the book was issued in a second edition with Bruce Patton, an editor of the first edition, listed as a co-author. The main difference between the second and first editions was the addition of a chapter after the main text entitled "Ten Questions People Ask About Getting to Yes".

The book became a perennial best-seller. By July 1998, it had been appearing for more than three years on the BusinessWeek "Best-Seller" book list. As of December 2007, it was still making appearances on the list as one of the "Longest Running Best Sellers" in paperback business books.

The third edition was published in 2011. Among other changes to the second edition, the third edition added newer examples of negotiations, such as a conflict in Iraq after Saddam Hussein had fallen from power; paragraphs on "core concerns" and "the role of identity"; a section "How should we communicate?"; and a section "There is power in effective communication". As of 2022, Ury asserted on his website that 15 million copies of the book had been sold, and that it had been translated into more than 35 languages.

== Method of principled negotiation ==
The book begins with a chapter "Don't Bargain Over Positions" that explains the undesirable characteristics of positional bargaining, in which the negotiating parties argue over a sequence of positions. Such an argument "produces unwise outcomes", "is inefficient", and "endangers an ongoing relationship".

The next four chapters describe the method of principled negotiation which was developed at the Harvard Negotiation Project (part of the Program on Negotiation consortium) by Fisher, Ury, and Patton. The purpose of principled negotiation is to "decide issues on their merits rather than through a haggling process". The method is based on four principles:

=== "Separate the people from the problem" ===
The first principle of Getting to Yes—"Separate the people from the problem"—applies to the interaction between the two parties to a negotiation. The authors point out that negotiators are people first—people who have different values, cultural backgrounds, and emotions. The relationship between parties tends to become entangled with the problem that the parties are discussing; therefore, issues of perception, emotion, and communication need to be addressed during a negotiation.

Concerning perception, the authors note that it is important for a negotiator to understand how the other party views an issue. Ways to accomplish this include "Put yourself in their shoes", "Discuss each other's perceptions", and "Face-saving: Make your proposals consistent with their values".

Concerning emotion, the authors encourage negotiators to explore the causes of both their own and the other party's emotions. Techniques may be needed to defuse anger, such as allowing the other party to voice grievances and to provide an apology as a symbolic gesture.

Concerning communication, the authors point out three common problems and give suggestions to prevent or solve them:

1. Not speaking with the other party in a direct and clear manner;
2. Not actively listening to the other party, but instead only listening to rebut the other party's statements; and
3. Misunderstanding or misinterpreting what the other party has said.

=== "Focus on interests, not positions" ===
The second principle—"Focus on interests, not positions"—distinguishes the positions that the parties hold from the interests that led them to those positions. For example, in 1978 Israel and Egypt both held positions about occupying the Sinai Peninsula, but the reasons for the positions were different: Israel was interested in security and Egypt was interested in sovereignty. Addressing the underlying interests of the two nations led to the Egypt–Israel peace treaty of 1979. The authors recommend that negotiators identify interests, such as the "basic human needs" of "economic well-being" and "control over one's life", behind the parties' positions. Both parties should then discuss their interests and keep an open mind to the other side of the argument, in order to arrive at options that satisfy their respective interests.

=== "Invent options for mutual gain" ===
The third principle—"Invent options for mutual gain"—seeks to benefit both parties that are negotiating. To generate options, the authors suggest that the parties brainstorm separately and possibly together. The book describes specific techniques to promote effective brainstorming; for example, a "Circle Chart" diagrams the repeated steps of Problem, Analysis, Approaches, and Action Ideas that should occur. Options can either meet shared interests or meet different interests that are complementary (as in the nursery rhyme "Jack Sprat"). After a suitable option is developed, one side can draft a written agreement to make the decision easy for the other side.

=== "Insist on using objective criteria" ===
The fourth principle—"Insist on using objective criteria"—encourages parties to "negotiate on some basis independent of the will of either side". This approach can help produce "wise agreements amicably and efficiently", as in the case of negotiations about the Law of the Sea. Objective criteria can be based on factors such as market value and precedent. The three steps for using objective criteria in negotiations are to jointly search for such criteria, to keep an open mind about which criteria should be chosen to be applied, and to never give in to pressure or threats. The chapter on this principle concludes with an example of objective criteria being used successfully in a negotiation between a person whose car is a total loss and an insurance claims adjuster.

== Answers to questions ==
All three editions of the book provide answers to three questions about the method of principled negotiation. The second and third editions answer ten other questions about negotiation.

=== "What if they are more powerful?" ===
If the other side "has a stronger bargaining position", the authors recommend "Develop Your BATNA—Best Alternative To a Negotiated Agreement". The BATNA is "the results you can obtain without negotiating". The authors give three suggestions to develop a BATNA that both protects the negotiator from accepting an agreement that should be rejected and improves any agreement that is accepted:

1. Creating a list of actions one might take if no agreement is reached
2. Transforming some of the more promising ideas into options
3. Selecting the option that appears best

=== "What if they won't play?" ===
If the other side demands to use positional bargaining, a negotiator may attempt "negotiation jujitsu". One method is to ask a third party to mediate. In this "one-text procedure", the third party explores the parties' interests and iteratively develops a solution with them. The authors cite the negotiations that led to the 1978 Camp David Accords as an example of the one-text procedure, with the United States drafting agreements between Egypt and Israel.

=== "What if they use dirty tricks?" ===
The authors point to the outcome of the Munich Agreement in 1938 as an example of a negotiator's failure to address "dirty tricks", in that case Adolf Hitler's negotiating tactics with Neville Chamberlain. Instead, the parties should negotiate about the rules of negotiation using the four principles stated earlier in the book. This can overcome tactics such as misrepresentation and psychological pressure.

=== Ten other questions ===
The second and third editions contain a chapter after the main text entitled "Ten Questions People Ask About Getting to Yes". The questions and answers concern "fairness and 'principled' negotiation", "dealing with people", "tactics", and "power".

== Reception ==
The book has been called "arguably one of, if not the most famous, works on the topic of negotiation" as well as a "wellspring for cutting-edge academic research". The principles in the book have been applied to numerous negotiations. Nevertheless, it has received criticisms.

=== Applications of principled negotiation ===
Organizational and individual negotiators have applied the principles of Getting to Yes. In 2001, the health insurance company Blue Cross and Blue Shield of Florida (later Florida Blue) formed a department to implement principled negotiation. The purpose was to address the problems of increasing competition, rising healthcare prices, and increased customer expectations. For instance, the company used principled negotiation to form a joint venture with its competitor Humana. Applying principled negotiation techniques occurred more naturally at the executive level than at lower levels of management.

In social work, principled negotiation can be used to advocate for a client's interests. For example, a social worker may need to negotiate with a government social services agency to obtain services for a client. In the field of psychology, principled negotiation has formed the basis for educational exercises about critical thinking.

=== Cross-cultural applications ===
A 2008 review of literature concluded that the book's ideas could be applied to cross-cultural negotiations "if interests are defined to include cultural interests". For example, when negotiating with people in China, a negotiator should be aware of the Thirty-Six Stratagems which may be employed.

A 2020 literature review found significant differences in negotiation styles across various cultures, suggesting that negotiators must adapt their strategies based on cultural contexts. Additionally, a 2022 literature review found that the successful application of most principled negotiation techniques is often hindered by the predominantly Western perspective through which these techniques were conceptualized.

=== Criticism ===
Gerald M. Steinberg in a 1982 review criticized Fisher and Ury for "describ[ing] the world as it should be, and not as it is". For instance, in practice it can be difficult to find mutually agreeable objective criteria in a negotiation. Furthermore, Fisher and Ury assume that negotiating parties are "unitary actors", but negotiations often involve "complex collective entities, such as states".

James J. White, a professor of law at the University of Michigan, suggested in 1984 that Getting to Yes is not scholarly or analytical and relies on anecdotal evidence, and that "the authors seem to deny the existence of a significant part of the negotiation process, and to oversimplify or explain away many of the most troublesome problems inherent in the art and practice of negotiation". In particular, the book does not discuss in enough detail distributive bargaining, in which a gain for one party is a loss for the other. Fisher responded that the book is intended to give advice, and that "distributional problems" can be reconceptualized as "shared problems". Nevertheless, Fisher reported that when teaching a negotiation course he tore a copy of the book in half to emphasize that it was imperfect.

Carrie Menkel-Meadow noted in 1984 that legal negotiators might adopt some of Fisher and Ury's ideas by using a problem solving approach instead of an adversarial approach. Nevertheless, she felt that ideas such as "separate the people from the problem" would not apply. In 2006, Menkel-Meadow praised Getting To Yes for inspiring a "rich research and teaching agenda", but also claimed that the factors leading to successful versus failed negotiations are still unclear.

In a 1985 article, William McCarthy described eight areas in which he agreed with the book, but also listed reservations and disagreements. The reservations included the authors' emphasis on long-term relationships (when immediate actions are sometimes required); the assumption that trust is unnecessary in negotiation; and the suggestion to "avoid starting from extremes". The main disagreement was that the book did not consider the need of a negotiator to prevail when a negotiation involves a power struggle. Fisher replied that he agreed with some of McCarthy's criticisms, for example that "Getting to YES probably overstates the case against positional bargaining".

A 1996 paper argued that the book's distinction between "interests" and "positions" was a problem. There can be a difference between objective interests (that help an individual) and subjective interests (that the individual perceives to be helpful, but that may not be). A negotiating party's public position may be different from that the course of action that the party will actually pursue. If a party's interest is in maintaining internal unity, it may adopt a position that preserves that unity, thus causing an overlap between position and interest.

A 1997 feminist analysis of the book's recommendations appeared in the Otago Law Review. It maintained that the book is written from a male perspective, and that some of its advice may not be appropriate for female negotiators.

The author of a 2003 examination of the history of alternative dispute resolution felt that Getting to Yes is a "classic text". Nevertheless, the book failed to realistically account for competition among negotiating parties and failed to consider complex personal dynamics during negotiations. A 2013 Forbes article asserted that the techniques in the book do not work for three reasons: people do not trust other people, people are not rational, and people do not enjoy negotiating.

A 2012 commentary noted that Australian practice guidelines for lawyers supported interest-based negotiation of the type described in Getting to Yes, but that such a negotiation style is not always more ethical than positional negotiation. It is possible for both types of negotiation to be unethical. Instead, it is ethical for a lawyer to be able to adjust negotiation strategies to provide effective advocacy for a client. The need for flexibility in negotiation styles was echoed in a 2015 paper calling principled negotiations a "false promise".

Chris Voss, a former FBI agent, mentioned Getting to Yes in his 2016 book Never Split the Difference. He called Fisher and Ury's book "a groundbreaking treatise" and wrote "I still agree with many of the powerful bargaining strategies in the book". But he criticized their methods as inadequate for hostage negotiations such as the Waco siege: "I mean, have you ever tried to devise a mutually beneficial win–win solution with a guy who thinks he's the messiah?" Voss presented alternative techniques for such situations, including "the flip side of Getting to Yes": getting to "no".

== Related books by Fisher and Ury ==
Fisher and Ury wrote related books whose titles played on the title of Getting to Yes. Fisher and Scott Brown wrote Getting Together: Building a Relationship That Gets to Yes (1988). Fisher and Danny Ertel wrote Getting Ready to Negotiate: The Getting to Yes Workbook (1995). Ury wrote Getting Past No: Negotiating with Difficult People (1991, revised in 1993 as Getting Past No: Negotiating Your Way from Confrontation to Cooperation or Getting Past No: Negotiating in Difficult Situations); Getting to Peace: Transforming Conflict at Home, at Work, and in the World (1999, later released as The Third Side: Why We Fight and How We Can Stop); The Power of a Positive No: How to Say No and Still Get to Yes (2007); and Getting to Yes with Yourself (And Other Worthy Opponents) (2015).

== See also ==
- Conflict resolution
- List of books about negotiation
- Negotiation theory
- Rogerian argument
- Vicente Blanco Gaspar
