= William Ury =

American author, anthropologist, and negotiation expert (born 1953)

- Born: September 12, 1953 (age 72); Chicago, Illinois, United States
- Education: Phillips Academy; Yale University; Harvard University
- Occupations: Author, academic, anthropologist, negotiation expert
- Children: Gabi; Christian; Thomas
- Relatives: Brendon Urie (cousin)

William Ury is an American author, academic, anthropologist, and negotiation expert. He co-founded the Harvard Program on Negotiation. Additionally, he helped found the International Negotiation Network with former President Jimmy Carter. Ury is the co-author of Getting to Yes with Roger Fisher, which set out the method of principled negotiation and established the idea of the best alternative to a negotiated agreement (BATNA) within negotiation theory.

== Background ==
Ury was educated at Le Rosey and at Phillips Andover where he graduated in 1970. In college, Ury studied anthropology, linguistics, and classics. Ury received his B.A. from Yale and his PhD in social anthropology from Harvard. In 1979 he co-founded the Harvard Negotiation Project of which he is currently a Distinguished Fellow. In 1981, he helped found the Program on Negotiation at Harvard Law School.

== Books ==
Ury co-authored Getting to Yes with Roger Fisher as a guide for international mediators. It was first published in 1981, then published in a second edition in 1991 with Bruce Patton credited as a contributing author. A third edition was published in 2012.

Other books written by Ury include:

- Beyond the Hotline: How Crisis Control Can Prevent Nuclear War (1985) (edited by Martin Linsky)
- Getting Disputes Resolved: Designing Systems to Cut the Costs of Conflict (1988) (with Jeanne M Brett and Stephen B Goldberg)
- Getting Past No: Negotiating with Difficult People (1993)
- Getting to Peace: Transforming Conflict at Home, at Work, and in the World (1999), published in paperback as The Third Side: Why We Fight and How We Can Stop (2000)
- Must We Fight?: From the Battlefield to the Schoolyard, A New Perspective on Violent Conflict and Its Prevention (2002)
- The Power of a Positive No: How to Say No and Still Get to Yes (2007)
- Getting to Yes with Yourself (And Other Worthy Opponents) (2015)
- Possible: How We Survive (and Thrive) in an Age of Conflict (2024)

== International work ==
Ury has worked as a negotiation adviser and mediator in conflicts in the Middle East, the Balkans, the former Soviet Union, Indonesia, Yugoslavia, Chechnya, and Venezuela among other countries.

Ury founded and served as the director of the Harvard Nuclear Negotiation Project. In 1982, the United States Arms Control and Disarmament Agency requested that the Harvard Negotiation Project compile a report applying its understanding of human communication to the issue of superpower restraint to reduce the risk of a war started by accident, terrorism, mistake, runaway escalation, or misperception. Together with Richard Smoke, Ury interviewed U.S. and Soviet specialists and government officials, and published the report for the government in 1984. The report was the basis for Ury's book Beyond the Hotline. During this time, he also acted as a consultant to the Crisis Management Center at the White House, working to create Nuclear Risk Reduction Centers in Washington and Moscow, which were the subject of the first arms control agreement signed by President Ronald Reagan and General Secretary Mikhail Gorbachev.

Together with former President Jimmy Carter, Ury co-founded the International Negotiation Network, which worked to end civil wars around the world. The International Negotiation Network was led by a council that included Carter and Desmond Tutu. Other notable people involved with the Network include Javier Pérez de Cuéllar, Sonny Ramphal, and Sir Brian Urquhart.

Ury teaches negotiation to international corporate executives and labor leaders to reach mutually profitable agreements with customers, suppliers, unions and joint-venture partners.

In 2001, Ury co-founded the e-Parliament with Nicholas Dunlop. The website serves as a global forum for international elected officials to work on issues of common interest. The e-Parliament has given birth to the Climate Parliament, which links thousands of elected officials from 50 different countries to work together informally on issues of renewable energy and climate.

=== Abraham Path ===
In 2007, Ury founded the Abraham Path Initiative, a long-distance walking trail across the Middle East which connects the sites visited by Abraham as recorded in ancient religious texts and traditions. The Abraham Path Initiative was incubated at the Harvard Negotiation Project and is endorsed by the United Nations World Tourism Organization, the United Nations Alliance of Civilizations and other international partners. The non-profit, non-religious and non-political initiative aims to support local partners in developing the Abraham Path as:

- a catalyst for socioeconomic development and sustainable tourism
- a place of meeting and connection between people from the Middle East and people around the world
- a creative space for stories that highlight the unique culture, heritage and hospitality of the region

In April 2014, the Abraham Path was listed in National Geographic Traveler (UK) magazine as number one on its list of the ten best walking trails in the world.

== Awards ==
Ury is the recipient of the Whitney North Seymour Award from the American Arbitration Association. He also received the Distinguished Service Medal from the Russian Parliament for his work on the resolution of ethnic conflicts. He received the 2012 Peacemakers Award from Mediators Beyond Borders. On March 11, 2022, Ury received the International Advocate for Peace Award from the Cardozo Journal of Conflict Resolution—the country's preeminent legal journal of arbitration, negotiation, mediation, settlement, and restorative justice—as part of its Melnick Annual Symposium.

== See also ==
- Conflict resolution
- List of books about negotiation
- Method of Harvard Principled Negotiation
