= Lawrence Susskind =

American urban planner

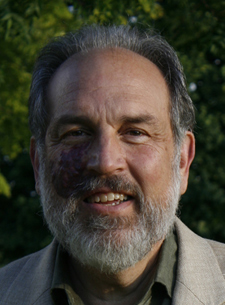
- Born: January 12, 1947 (age 79); New York City, U.S.
- Education: Columbia University; Massachusetts Institute of Technology
- Known for: Mutual Gains Approach, "Breaking Robert's Rules," "Breaking The Impasse," "Dealing With An Angry Public," "Transboundary Environmental Negotiation"
- Awards: Association of Conflict Resolution’s Pioneer Award * Association of Collegiate Schools of Planning Distinguished Educator of the Year award * Global Environmental Award of the International Association of Impact Assessment * Best Book in the Dispute Resolution Field (1997 and 2000). * Peacemaker of the Year Award (2011) from Mediators Beyond Borders
- Scientific career
- Fields: alternative dispute resolution, environmental planning, urban studies and planning
- Doctoral students: Leah Stokes
- Other notable students: Saleem Ali (academic)

Lawrence E. Susskind (born January 12, 1947) is a scholar of conflict resolution and consensus-building in urban planning. He is one of the founders of the field of public dispute mediation and is a practicing international mediator through the Consensus Building institute. He has taught at the Massachusetts Institute of Technology since 1971, where he is Ford Professor of Environmental Planning.

In 1993, Susskind founded the Consensus Building Institute (CBI), a Cambridge-based not-for-profit that is now a leading mediation service provider. Through CBI, he has advised the Supreme Courts of Israel, Ireland, and the Philippines; helped to facilitate a variety of international treaty-making efforts; developed the techniques of conflict assessment and joint fact-finding; evaluated collaborative adaptive management efforts; and created new strategies for building organizational negotiating capabilities. In addition to his appointment at MIT, he has been part of the inter-university Program on Negotiation at Harvard Law School since 1982.

== Personal life ==
Susskind was born with a prominent vascular birthmark (of the naevus flammeus aka "port-wine stain" variety) on his right cheek. He grew up in New York City and in 1983 married Leslie Tuttle. They raised their two children in Southborough, MA where Susskind created the Southborough Open Land Foundation. They currently live in Cambridge, MA.

== Academic career ==
Susskind received his BA from Columbia University in 1968. At MIT, he earned a Master of City Planning and a PhD in Urban and Regional Planning. In 1971, he joined the faculty in MIT's Department of Urban Studies and Planning and subsequently served as assistant head and head of the Department. He created MIT's Environmental Policy and Planning Group, and since 1995 has held the title of Ford Professor of Urban and Environmental Planning. As a professor at MIT he has supervised 60 doctoral students and over 100 Master's students.

In 1983 he became the first Executive Director of the interuniversity Program on Negotiation (PON) at Harvard Law School, which he co-founded with Roger Fisher (Harvard Law School), Howard Raiffa (Harvard Business School), Frank Sander (Harvard Law School), Robert McKersie (MIT's Sloan School of Management), and Jeffrey Z. Rubin (The Fletcher School at Tufts University). Through PON, Susskind has helped to produce over 100 role-play simulation teaching exercises, teaching videos, and other pedagogical supports used internationally, including The Young Negotiator Program for middle schools, Workable Peace for high school students, and exercises taught at the most advanced graduate student levels. At PON he is currently Vice Chair for Education and co-director of the Negotiation Pedagogy Initiative.

Along with Herman Karl from the United States Geological Survey, Susskind established the MIT Science Impact Collaborative in 2003 to train "science impact coordinators"—multidisciplinary professionals with a background in science who can work at the intersection of science, policy, and politics. Based at MIT, the Science Impact Collaborative program trains graduate students who apprentice for two years as part of their graduate studies and assist public and not-for-profit agencies involved in natural resource management. The Science Impact Collaborative has established a way of applying consensus building in a wide range of resource management situations.

He is director of the MIT-Harvard Public Disputes Program that has made the case for mediated approaches to international treaty-making and worked to support the land claims of indigenous peoples throughout the world. He has held visiting professor appointments at Harvard Law School, Stanford Law School, University of Hawaii, University of California-Berkeley, European University Institute, and elsewhere. He has been a visiting lecturer at more than 50 universities in 20 countries.

He and his fellow professors offer multiple training sessions each year to interested participants. He offers sessions such as Senior Executive Program on Negotiation, Negotiation Master Class, Real Estate Negotiation, Dealing with an Angry Public, Water Diplomacy Workshop and many more. His expertise in these areas of study allow him to offer innovative information to the public that would not normally have access to his teachings.

== Public Dispute Mediation ==
=== United States ===
Mediation as a tool for public decision-making emerged in the 1970s. In the mid-1970s, Massachusetts Governor Michael Dukakis asked Susskind to help more than thirty agencies, companies and community groups reach a timely agreement on how to handle the environmental impacts of a proposed mass transit extension in Cambridge, Massachusetts. He worked with the Kettering Foundation to facilitate a federal-state-local negotiated investment strategy for Columbus, Ohio. This was followed by efforts to reach accord in Maine on where to site a low level radioactive waste repository; an appointment by New Jersey's highest court to settle a long-standing lawsuit regarding pollution clean-up in Camden (NJ) Harbor; and work with the Massachusetts Energy Facility Siting Council that led to the creation of the Facility Siting Credo. Susskind has mediated disputes in the health care field (a controversial decision to relocate the Veterans Hospital in Meriden, Connecticut; efforts to revise a labor contract between the nurses union and the University of Michigan medical system), the field of housing and community economic development (a regional effort to allocate "fair shares" of affordable housing in the Hartford, Connecticut metropolitan area; resolution of growing tensions between elected neighborhood boards and the Honolulu city council); the field of public education (including a tense, racially based conflict over the drawing of school district boundaries in Rocky Mount, North Carolina); and in the environmental field, where he has mediated disputes over water allocation in Massachusetts, emission standards for a proposed solid waste incinerator in New York City, and clean-up of water contamination at a U.S. Department of Defense site in Massachusetts. Susskind was the originator of the idea of creating state offices of mediation, many of which are still in operation. He played a role in the 2002 National Energy Policy Initiative (NEPI), undertaken with the Rocky Mountain Institute, which followed an effort a decade earlier to help win bi-partisan support for national energy strategy for the United States. With Gregg Macey Susskind worked with the US Environmental Protection Agency to explore the use of consensus building approach to resolving environmental justice disputes. This included organizing workshops for the heads of EJ groups from all over the Southeastern United States. He assisted with the implementation of Project XL—a negotiated regulatory strategy of the Clinton Administration's aimed at demonstrating that a command-and-control approach could be replaced by a more informal facilitated dialogue and still ensure that air quality, water quality and other environmental mandates were met. Susskind was part of a multiyear effort to train the U.S. Army Corps of Engineers (as part of ongoing leadership development) in the use of mediation and other forms of dispute resolution to resolve contract disputes. At the time the Corps was contracting for more than $10 billion annually and was caught up in lengthy litigation with many of its construction contractors. The training led to successful experiments with mediated dispute resolution. At the national level in the United States, Susskind helped the US EPA undertake a series of negotiated rule-making experiments that led to the adoption of the Administrative Dispute Resolution Act. He also worked with the United States Geological Survey to create the MIT-USGS Science Impact Collaborative that provided mediation assistance in more than a dozen science-intensive public policy disputes while at the same time serving as a training ground for a new cadre of science impact coordinators.

=== International ===
Susskind spent more than 10 years trying to help mediate the land claims of Bedouins living in Israel and to build a successful joint Israeli-Palestinian mediating organization. In Canada, he has worked with First Nations and the First Nations Tax Commission to build better relationships between First Nations and pipeline companies. Also, in Canada, he worked with the Alberta Environmental Appeals Board over more than 10 years to successfully introduce mediation to their administrative appeals process. He worked with the Climate Change secretariat to organize pre-conference brainstorming sessions in advance of the Kyoto Protocol negotiations, with the Asian Development Bank and the International Finance Corporation to introduce mediation to their compliance review process; with the Organization for Economic Cooperation and Development to build mediation capabilities to better implement their corporate social responsibility guidelines; with the World Trade Organization to facilitate productive dialogue with global environmental treaty organizations; with the Dutch Ministry of Environment to build their capacity to mediate disputes over efforts to promote more sustainable development; and with the United Nations and the Group of 77 to build the G-77's ability to handle internal conflict. In a consensus-building effort was convened by the European Bank for Reconstruction and Development, Susskind facilitated meetings of the Ministers of Environment from all over Central and Eastern Europe in an effort to help them harmonize environmental regulations.

With Professor Shafiqul Islam at Tufts University, Susskind has created the Water Diplomacy Workshop, an annual train-the-trainer program for senior water professionals from the developing world who want to learn about the Water Diplomacy Framework—a consensus building alternative to more traditional ways of handling conflicts over shared or boundary waters. They have also organized the international Research Coordination Network for university-based research centers focused on water conflict. In addition, they have created the Aquapedia at Tufts, an open source advisory tool that describes and analyzes a growing number of case studies of efforts to manage water conflict around the world.

== Consensus building ==
Susskind has written about the theory and practice of consensus building, reflecting on his own mediation experience as well as the work of others. Through JAMS (formerly known as Endispute, Inc.), which Susskind helped found in the early 1980s, and later through CBI, Susskind's practice has applied these theories of consensus building to a range of governmental, corporate, and international dispute resolution efforts.

His book (with Jeffrey Cruikshank) Breaking the Impasse (1987) spells out the ways in which mediation can be used to resolve a range of multiparty disputes involving the allocation of scarce resources, the setting of public policy priorities, and the establishment of health, safe, and environmental standards. Susskind's thesis is this: when there are many stakeholders who think they have a right to be involved in complex socio-ecological decisions that might affect them, outcomes that are fairer, more efficient, more stable and wiser are more likely to emerge if the public agencies involved adopt a consensus building approach (CBA). This means that they ought to utilize an informal problem-solving process assisted by a professional mediator. It also means that they should employ a range of group problem-solving and deliberative techniques (including conflict assessment and joint fact finding) that add political legitimacy to efforts to supplement the usual means of democratic decision-making.

Susskind summarizes the experience of over 40 of America's leading mediators and inventories best practices in the consensus building field in The Consensus Building Handbook (with Sarah McKearnan and Jennifer Thomas-Larmer) (1999). In Dealing with an Angry Public (with Patrick Field) (1995), Susskind extends his analysis to crisis management situations in which "angry publics" of various kinds protest what they see as the risks, dangers or adverse impacts of actions proposed by or undertaken by corporations or public agencies. Rather than "managing or handling" these individuals, Susskind and Field suggest negotiating with them. Planning Magazine named Dealing with an Angry Public one of the "ten most important books in the urban planning field in the 20th century."

Susskind has tried to apply consensus building techniques to global environmental treaty-making. Since nations are sovereign, all multilateral agreements must be reached through a process of diplomatic negotiation. In Environmental Diplomacy (1993) Susskind explores the ways in which global treaty-making can be improved through the formal involvement of non-governmental interests, a better balance between science and politics, the use of contingent agreements, and the involvement of professional mediators. For twenty years, Susskind and his colleague, William Moomaw of The Fletcher School, have published Papers on International Environmental Treaty-making (Program on Negotiation at Harvard Law School) providing detailed evidence to support these assertions. In Transboundary Environmental Negotiation (with William Moomaw and Paul Gallagher) (2001), they offer detailed case studies of consensus building in global environmental treaty-making.

Susskind produced a detailed guide that groups and organizations of all kinds can use instead a consensus building alternative to parliamentary procedure. This book, Breaking Robert’s Rules (2006) has been re-written with co-authors in Japan, China, Brazil, France, Russia, Italy, Argentina and the Netherlands and argues that a consensus building approach can yield agreements that satisfy the competing interests of many parties, save time and money, and improve long-term relationships. In his four-volume compendium (with Larry Crump) entitled Multiparty Negotiation (2008), Susskind collects the theoretical contributions to and published examples of multiparty negotiation in the public policy, legal, organizational and international relations fields. This set won the Outstanding Book Award from the International Association for Conflict Management (IACM).

In Built to Win: Creating a World-Class Negotiating Organization, Susskind and Hal Movius (2009) explain why negotiation training so often produces less than satisfying results. They try to show that the way companies support and enhance their overall negotiating efforts rather than emphasizing individual skill building yields better results. Based on their work with a range of well-known multinational corporations, they describe an organizational development approach to improving negotiating capabilities. McDonald's East Division President called it "an essential read."

In Good for You, Great for Me: Finding the Trading Zone and Winning at Win-Win Negotiation (2014), Susskind focuses on the fact that all consensus building efforts, regardless of how cooperative the parties may choose to be, must at some point involve the distribution of the value the negotiators have created. The process of "claiming" value re-introduces competitive aspects of negotiation that has been de-emphasized in the mutual gains or "principled" approach. Nevertheless, as Susskind points out, there are ways that "win-win" negotiators can claim a disproportionate share of the value they helped to create without ruining relationships or resorting to hard bargaining. He also introduces the trading zone, a theoretical and practice idea that takes better account of the psychological dimensions of negotiation than earlier concepts like Best Alternative to a Negotiated Agreement (BATNA).

== Prizes and awards ==
- Peacemaker of the Year Award, from Mediators Beyond Borders (2011)
- Association of Conflict Resolution's (ACR) Pioneer Award for his leadership in developing the public dispute resolution field.
- Association of Collegiate Schools of Planning Distinguished Educator of the Year award, for bringing a focus on negotiation and dispute resolution to the field of urban planning (2005).
- Global Environmental Award of the International Association of Impact Assessment for his efforts to help strengthen the environmental impact procedures through the application of consensus building techniques (2007).
- Best Book in the Dispute Resolution field (2000) awarded by the Center for Public Research, for The Consensus Building Handbook.
- Best Book in the Dispute Resolution field (1997) awarded by the Center for Public Research, for Dealing with an Angry Public.
- Goodwin Award (1973) for Teaching Excellence as a Graduate Instructor at MIT.

== Partial bibliography ==
=== Books ===
- Managing Climate Risks in Coastal Cities (with Danya Rumore, Carri Hulet, and Patrick Field) (Anthem)
- Good for You, Great for Me: Finding the Trading Zone and Winning at Win-Win Negotiation (Public Affairs)
- Water Diplomacy: A Negotiated Approach to Managing Complex Water Networks (with Shafiqul Islam) (Resources for the Future)
- Paternalism, Conflict and Co-Production (Plenum Publishers)
- Breaking The Impasse (all language editions) (Basic Books)
- Environmental Diplomacy (all language editions) (Oxford University Press)
- Dealing with an Angry Public (all language editions) (Free Press)
- Better Environmental Policy Studies (Island Press)
- Negotiating on Behalf of Others (Sage)
- Negotiating Environmental Agreements (Island Press)
- Transboundary Environmental Negotiation (Jossey-Bass)
- Breaking Robert’s Rules (all language editions) (Oxford University Press)
- The Cure for Our Broken Political Process (Potomac Press)
- Multiparty Negotiation (Sage)
- Addressing the Land Claims of Indigenous Peoples (MIT Human Rights Program)
- Built to Win (all language editions) (Harvard Business Publishing)
- Entrepreneurial Negotiation (Palgrave Macmillan)

=== Edited volumes ===
- Consensus Building Handbook (all language editions) (Sage)
- Papers on International Environmental Negotiation (ed. with William Moomaw et al.) – volumes 1 – 17 (Program on Negotiation at Harvard Law School)
- Environmental Impact Assessment Review (volumes 1 - 17) (Plenum)

See also:

- Water and Democracy: New Roles for Civil Society in Water Governance, Journal of Water and International Development, June 2013.
- Water Diplomacy: Creating Value and Building Trust in Transboundary Water Negotiations (with Shafiqul Islam), Science and Diplomacy, a quarterly publication from the AAAS Center for Science Diplomacy, August 22, 2012.
- Chapter in Deborah Kolb's book, When Talk Works (Jossey-Bass, San Francisco) (describing Susskind's mediation practice).
- Arguing, Bargaining and Getting Agreement. Volume 10 of the Oxford Handbooks of Political Science, General Editor Robert E. Goodin, Oxford Handbook of Public Policy (edited by Michael Moran, Martin Rein And Robert E. Goodin) Oxford University Press.
- A Critical Assessment of Collaborative Adaptive Management in Practice (with Alexander Camacho and Todd Schenk). 49 Journal of Applied Ecology 47-51 (2011).
- Collaborative Planning and Adaptive Management in Glen Canyon: A Cautionary Tale (with Alejandro E. Camacho and Todd Schenk), Columbia Journal of Environmental Law, Vol. 35, No. 1, 2010 UC Irvine School of Law Research Paper No. 2010-6.
- Deliberative Democracy and Dispute Resolution article based on the Schwartz Lecture on Dispute Resolution given at The Ohio State University Moritz College of Law on April 10, 2008 (Ohio State Journal On Dispute Resolution [Vol. 24:3 2009]).
- Expanding the Ethical Obligations of the Mediator: Mediator Accountability to Parties Not at the Table (with Carrie Menkel-Meadow and Michael Wheeler), What's Fair, Ethics for Negotiators. Cambridge, MA: A Publication of the Program on Negotiation at Harvard Law School, Jossey-Bass, pp 513–518. 2004.
- Environmental Mediation and the Accountability Problem, Vermont Law Review, Vol. 6, No. 1 Spring 1981.
- Four Important Changes in the American Approach to Environmental Regulation (Edited by F. Archibug; and P. Nijkamp), In Economics and Ecology: Toward Sustainable Development, Kluwert Academic Publishers, Dordrecht/Boston/London, 1989.
- Keynote Address: Consensus Building, Public Dispute Resolution, And Social Justice, Fordham Urban Law Journal, Vol. XXXVI (pages 185-203).
- Making Regional Policy Dialogues Work: A Credo for Metro-Scale Consensus Building (with Merrick Hoben), Temple Environmental Law and Technology Journal, Vol. XXII, No.2, Spring 2004.
- Mediated Negotiation in the Public Sector: Mediator Accountability and Public Interest Problem, American Behavioral Scientist, Vol. 27, No. 2, November/December 1983.
- Mediated Negotiation in the Public Sector: The Planner as Mediator, (with Connie Ozawa), Journal of Planning Education and Research, Vol. 4, No. 1, August 1984.
- Multistakeholder Dialogue at the Global Scale (with Boyd W. Fuller, Michéle Ferenz, David Fairman), International Negotiation Journal, 8 (2), 235-266. 2003.
- Policy & Practice Responding to the Risks Posed by Climate Change: Cities Have No Choice But to Adapt, Town Planning Review (pp. 217–235).
- Public Entrepreneurship Networks (with David Laws, James Abrams, Jonna Anderson, Ginette Chapman, Emily Rubenstein, and Jaisel Vadgama), MIT Environmental Technology and Public Policy Program Publication ETP 01-01, 2001.
- Report of the Pre-COP Informal Workshop on Climate Change, Buenos Aires (with William Moomaw, Kilaparti Ramakrishna, and Janet Martinez), Consensus Building Institute, 1998.
- Seeking Operational Flexibility and Pollution Prevention Under Title V of the Clean Air Act: EPA's P4 Program (with Michael Crow and Amy Pfeiffer), Environmental Engineering and Policy, 2, Number 1, August 2000.
- Strengthening the Global Environmental Treaty System, Issues in Science and Technology, Volume 25, Issue 1, Fall 2008.
- Teaching Multiparty Negotiation: A Workbook (with Robert Mnookin, Boyd Fuller and Lukasz Rozdeiczer), Program on Negotiation at Harvard Law School, 2003.
- Teaching About the Mediation of Values-Based and Identity-Based Disputes: A Teaching Note (with David Kovick, Kate Harvey, and Jennifer Brown), Program on Negotiation at Harvard Law School, 2009.
- Techniques for Resolving Coastal Resource Management Disputes Through Negotiation (with Scott McCreary), Journal of the American Planning Association, Summer 1985.
- Towards a Theory of Environmental Dispute Resolution (with Alan Weinstein), Boston College Environmental Affairs Law Review, Vol. 6, No. 1, May 1981.
- Using Assisted Negotiation to Settle Land Use Disputes, A Guidebook for Public Officials (with Ole Amundsen, Masahiro Matsuura, Marshall Kaplan, and David Lampe), Consensus Building Institute and Lincoln Institute of Land Policy, 1999.
- Using Simulations to Teach Negotiation: Pedagogical Theory and Practice (with Jason Corburn), Simulation und Planspiel in den Sozialwissenschaften, (Herz, Dietmar & Andreas Blätte, eds Eine Bestandsaufnahme der internationalen Diskussion, MÅester: Lit Verlag, 2000.
