= Program on Negotiation =

The Program on Negotiation (PON) is a university consortium dedicated to developing the theory and practice of negotiation and dispute resolution. As a community of scholars and practitioners, PON serves a unique role in the world negotiation community. Founded in 1983 as a special research project at Harvard Law School, PON includes faculty, students, and staff from Harvard University, Massachusetts Institute of Technology, Tufts University, and Brandeis University.

The Program on Negotiation publishes the quarterly Negotiation Journal and the monthly Negotiation Briefings newsletter, and distributes the annual Harvard Negotiation Law Review. Throughout the year PON offers a number of courses and training opportunities ranging in length from one day to an entire semester.

== History ==
In 1979, co-authors of the bestseller Getting to Yes: Negotiating Agreement without Giving In, Roger Fisher and William Ury, along with Bruce Patton founded the Harvard Negotiation Project (HNP), with a mission to improve the theory, teaching, and practice of negotiation and dispute resolution, so that people could deal more constructively with conflicts ranging from the interpersonal to the international. Fisher began by asking the question of what kind of advice could be given to both sides of a dispute, and in researching this question he came in contact with various professors, including James Sebenius, Lawrence Susskind, Frank Sander, and Howard Raiffa, who collaborated to form the Program on Negotiation.

The Program on Negotiation was founded in 1983 as the world's first teaching and research center dedicated to negotiation and dispute resolution. As an umbrella organization with founding members from both Harvard and MIT, it soon expanded to include Tufts University as one of its consortium schools. Since the beginning, the Program on Negotiation has been multi-disciplinary, with scholars from economics, government, law, business, psychology, anthropology, education, and the arts. Faculty have focused on a wide range of research topics, including deal-making, diplomatic negotiations, international negotiations, psychological aspects of negotiations, decision-making, issues relating to ethics and trust, and labor negotiations.

Chair of the Program on Negotiation since 1994, Professor Robert H. Mnookin is Samuel Williston Professor of Law at Harvard Law School. Among his recent publications are the books, Beyond Winning: Negotiating to Create Value in Deals and Disputes, and Bargaining with the Devil: When to Negotiate, When to Fight.

== Publications ==
The Program on Negotiation is responsible for multiple publications, including books, special reports, the Negotiation Briefings newsletter and the quarterly Negotiation Journal, a multidisciplinary international journal published by Wiley-Blackwell detailing the latest advances in the field. PON also regularly produces free reports that are available through their website, such as: "Teaching Negotiation: Understanding The Impact Of Role-Play Simulations", "Business Negotiation Strategies: How to Negotiate Better Business Deals", "Negotiation Skills: Negotiation Strategies and Negotiation Techniques to Help You Become a Better Negotiator", "Dealmaking: Secrets of Successful Dealmaking in Business Negotiations", "Negotiation Strategies for Women: Secrets to Success", "Dealing with Difficult People", "BATNA Basics: Boost Your Power at the Bargaining Table", "Sally Soprano: Role-Play Simulation", "Harborco: Role-Play Simulation", and "Win-Win or Hardball: Learn Top Strategies from Sports Contract Negotiations". All of PONs publications including books, case studies, and DVDs can be obtained through the PON Clearinghouse.

== Training ==
PON offers a number of training programs throughout the year on a variety of topics including negotiation, mediation, conflict resolution, deal design, difficult conversations, and many more. PON seminars and courses are open to the public.

=== Author Sessions ===
The Program on Negotiation offers one day Author Sessions focused on recent book publications by PON faculty members as part of its Executive Education Series. Recent courses included: Deal-Making and Negotiauctions, Creating a World-class Negotiating Organization, Bargaining with the Devil, and Negotiating International Deals.

=== Executive Education ===
Executive Education courses last for three days, covering strategies for business leaders to handle both successful day-to-day management and long-term strategies for healthy workplace environments. Executives learn tactics for dealing with dirty tricks, threats, attacks, and stonewalls from the other side of the table.

=== Harvard Negotiation Institute ===
Harvard Negotiation Institute (HNI) classes are offered every June and September on the Harvard Law School campus and cover a broad range of negotiation and mediation skills, ranging from beginning to advanced techniques. Most of the courses offered are five-day classes. However, a 2-day Intensive Negotiation Workshop for Lawyers and Working Professionals is also offered. Recent course offerings included: a mediation workshop, Creating Value in Deals and Disputes, Tools for Preparing and Negotiating Effectively, Deal Design and Implementation, and Difficult Conversations.

=== PON Seminars ===
Open to participants from all disciplines and professional fields, the PON Seminars provide negotiation and mediation courses to the community. These semester-length courses are designed to increase public awareness and understanding of successful conflict resolution efforts.

Two courses are taught each year: Negotiation and Dispute Resolution in the fall, and Mediation and Conflict Management in the spring. Both courses provide participants with a conceptual framework and practical advice for professional and personal development in dispute resolution. Faculty is drawn from the PON community of scholars and practitioners of alternative dispute resolution.

The Program on Negotiation also hosts a variety of smaller workshops and intensive two-day courses in addition to their normal course offerings, including on-site training. The Program on Negotiation also hosts a film series, and has a Graduate Research Fellowship.

== Great Negotiator Award ==
The Program on Negotiation established the Great Negotiator Award in 2000 to honor individuals of extraordinary achievement in dispute resolution. The award is designed not only to honor the accomplishments of outstanding negotiators, but also to focus public attention on the important role of negotiation as society faces increasingly complex disputes in all sectors–public and private, technological and ethical, personal and professional. PON has recognized a diverse cast of distinguished negotiators from their respective fields: Tommy Koh Thong Bee, Singaporean diplomat and Singapore Ambassador-at-large; Juan Manuel Santos, Nobel Peace Prize recipient and President of Colombia (2017); Martti Ahtisaari, Nobel Peace Prize recipient and former President of Finland (2010); Christo and Jeanne-Claude, the artists who created The Gates in Central Park (2008); Bruce Wasserstein, Chairman and CEO of Lazard, an international financial advisory and asset management firm (2007); Sadako Ogata, former United Nations high commissioner for refugees (2005); Richard Holbrooke, former United States ambassador to the United Nations (2004); Stuart Eizenstat, former U.S. ambassador to the European Union (2003); Ambassador Lakhdar Brahimi, the United Nations’ special envoy for Afghanistan (2002); Charlene Barshefsky, U.S. trade representative in the second Clinton administration (2001); and former U.S. Senator George Mitchell for his work in Northern Ireland (2000).

== See also ==
- Negotiation theory
