= Harvard Negotiation Project =

Program dealing with conflict resolution

- Formation: 1979
- Founder: William Ury; Roger Fisher
- Founded at: Harvard University
- Purpose: theory building education and training publications conflict clinic
- Location: Massachusetts
- Key people: James Sebenius (Director)

The Harvard Negotiation Project (HNP) was a project created at Harvard University in 1979 which dealt with issues of negotiation and conflict resolution. It is now (since 1983) the Program on Negotiation (PON). Its mission was

To improve the theory and practice of conflict resolution and negotiation by working on real world conflict intervention, theory building, education and training, and writing and disseminating new ideas.

The director of the project as of 2008 was Professor James Sebenius.

== Overview ==
The program was initiated in 1979, at the time of the commencement of activities the joint heads of the project were William Ury and Roger Fisher.

The project published a text titled Getting to Yes in 1981. Getting It DONE: How to Lead When You're Not in Charge was published in 1998, Difficult Conversations: How to Discuss What Matters Most in 1999, and Beyond Reason: Using Emotions as you Negotiate was published in 2006.

The project at some time identified four crucial factors for negotiation: people, interests, options and criteria (otherwise known as boundary conditions).

The activities of the project included theory building, education and training, publications and a conflict clinic.

== See also ==
- Vicente Blanco Gaspar
- Program on Negotiation
