= Roger Fisher (academic) =

American legal scholar (1922–2012)

- Born: May 28, 1922; Winnetka, Illinois, US
- Died: August 25, 2012 (aged 90); Hanover, New Hampshire, US
- Spouse: Caroline McMurtrie Speer (m. 1948; died 2010)
- Children: Elliott S. Fisher; Peter R. Fisher

Academic background
- Education: Harvard University

Academic work
- Discipline: Law
- Institutions: Harvard University
- Military career
- Branch: United States Army Air Forces
- Service years: 1942–1946
- Rank: First lieutenant
- Conflicts: World War II

Roger D. Fisher (May 28, 1922 – August 25, 2012) was a Samuel Williston Professor of Law at Harvard Law School and director of the Harvard Negotiation Project.

== Background ==
Fisher specialized in negotiation and conflict management. He was the co-author (with William Ury) of the book Getting to Yes, about "interest-based" negotiation, as well as numerous other publications. After serving in World War II as a weather reconnaissance pilot, Fisher worked on the Marshall Plan in Paris under W. Averell Harriman. After finishing his law degree at Harvard, he worked with the Washington, DC, law firm of Covington & Burling, arguing several cases before the US Supreme Court and advising on several international disputes. He returned to Harvard Law School and became a professor there in 1958. After having lost many of his friends in the war and seeing so many costly disputes as a litigator, Fisher became intrigued with the art and science of how we manage our differences. Fisher and his students at the Harvard Negotiation Project (founded in 1979) began interviewing people who were known as skilled negotiators in order to understand what made them effective. And he started his study of conflict with the question, "What advice could I give to both parties in a dispute that would be helpful and lead to better outcomes?" This work led to the draft, "International Mediation: A Working Guide" (April 1978), and, eventually, to the international best-seller Getting to Yes.

In the late 1960s, Fisher conceived of a court-style debate show that handled one contemporary policy issue each week. The Advocates premiered in October 1969 on WGBH-TV.

Throughout the 1980s and 1990s, Fisher and his colleagues taught courses on negotiation and conflict management at Harvard, but they also worked as advisors on real negotiations and conflicts of all types worldwide, including peace processes, hostage crises, diplomatic negotiations, and commercial and legal negotiations and disputes. Fisher believed that keeping one foot in the real world helping people with real disputes was critical to producing theory and tools useful in the real world.

Fisher continued to teach and write until his eighties. Follow-up books expanded his thinking about dealing with relationship challenges (Getting Together with Scott Brown), preparing effectively (Getting Ready to Negotiate with Danny Ertel), tools for dealing with bad actors and challenging parties (Beyond Machiavelli with Elizabeth Kopelman and Andrea Kupfer Schneider), galvanizing a group to do effective problem-solving (Getting It Done: How to Lead When You're Not in Charge with Alan Sharp and John Richardson), and the role of emotions in working relationships (Beyond Reason with Daniel Shapiro). In addition, colleagues at the Harvard Negotiation Project expanded the tradition Fisher founded and led. William Ury published Getting to Peace (1999), Getting Past No (1993), The Third Side: Why We Fight and How We Can Stop (2000) and The Power of a Positive No (2007). Douglas Stone, Bruce Patton and Sheila Heen produced Difficult Conversations: How to Talk About What Matters Most (1999).

Fisher's 2005 work, Beyond Reason: Using Emotions as You Negotiate (with co-author Daniel Shapiro, a Harvard psychologist) identifies five "core concerns" that everyone cares about: autonomy, affiliation, appreciation, status, and role. The book shows how to use the core concerns to stimulate helpful emotions in negotiations ranging from the personal to international. In Beyond Reason, Fisher documents many of his first-hand experiences negotiating around the world, from his involvement in negotiating the Iran hostage crisis to his advisory role in helping Jamil Mahuad, President of Ecuador (1998–2000), resolve a long-standing international border dispute.

Fisher received his bachelor's degree from Harvard in 1943 and his law degree from Harvard Law School in 1948. He taught at Harvard from 1958 to 1992.

In 1984, Fisher founded the Conflict Management Group (CMG) in Cambridge, Massachusetts. CMG specialized in facilitating negotiations in conflicts worldwide. CMG merged with the Mercy Corps humanitarian group in 2004. He was a member of the Council on Foreign Relations and of the International Editorial Board of the Cambridge Review of International Affairs.

== International work ==
Throughout his career, Fisher made significant efforts to seek peace in the Middle East. Among these efforts included his involvement in Egyptian President Anwar Sadat's trip to Jerusalem and the Camp David summit that led to an Israeli–Egyptian peace treaty. In this latter case, he helped devise a process called the one-text, where a facilitator shuttled back and forth between the parties, refining a proposed document until it could not satisfy the parties interests more effectively, at which point the parties either approve the document or agree to start from scratch. President Carter and Secretary of State Cyrus Vance created 23 drafts in 13 days before they had a proposal to which both sides could agree.

He advised both the Iranian and United States governments in negotiations for the release of the American hostages in 1981 where his work helped lead to the breakthrough that enabled the resolution.

In the 1980s, Fisher worked to bring peace to El Salvador.

External image
- The atypical photograph suggested by Fisher of the then Presidents of Ecuador and Peru looking at a document instead of shaking hands
- https://web.archive.org/web/20170301053323/http://www.beyond-reason.net/about/jamil.jpg

Later in his career, he helped resolve the Ecuadorian–Peruvian territorial dispute. Jamil Mahuad, the president of Ecuador and a former student of Fisher's asked for Fisher's advice soon after taking power in 1998. Fisher, worried that domestic hardliners could cause either president to use the negotiations to posture, advised President Mahuad to avoid the typical photograph of the two presidents shaking hands and instead get a photograph of them sitting side-by-side working off a common document. This photograph helped signal to the public in each country that the presidents would not be taking an adversarial approach to the negotiation and helped lower rhetoric on both sides.

In South Africa, Fisher worked on the negotiations and constitutional process that led to the end of apartheid. From the 1980s to the mid 1990s, at the direction of then Archbishop Desmond Tutu and Bishop Joseph Seoka, he and his colleagues at the Conflict Management group, the African National Congress, the National Party, the Dutch Reformed Church, the Azanian People's Organization, and the Inkatha Freedom Party taught interest-based negotiation processes to the leaders of all the factions as well as advised them and their negotiators. The lead constitutional negotiators, Cyril Ramaphosa and Roelf Meyer, later stated in an interview that the cooperative interest-based negotiation process taught by Fisher and his team was the approach that they, their principals, and their constituencies used to hammer out the new constitution and democratic elections processes.

== Preventing nuclear war ==
Fisher was known for a unique idea towards nuclear deterrence. In a March 1981 article in the Bulletin of the Atomic Scientists, while discussing the importance on reaching a "wise decision", especially in terms of nuclear arms, he suggested implanting the nuclear launch codes in a volunteer. If the President of the United States wanted to activate nuclear weapons, he would be required to kill the volunteer to retrieve the codes.

My suggestion was quite simple: Put that needed code number in a little capsule, and then implant that capsule right next to the heart of a volunteer. The volunteer would carry with him a big, heavy butcher knife as he accompanied the President. If ever the President wanted to fire nuclear weapons, the only way he could do so would be for him first, with his own hands, to kill one human being. The President says, "George, I'm sorry but tens of millions must die." He has to look at someone and realize what death is—what an innocent death is. Blood on the White House carpet. It's reality brought home.

When I suggested this to friends in the Pentagon they said, "My God, that's terrible. Having to kill someone would distort the President's judgment. He might never push the button."

— Roger Fisher, Bulletin of the Atomic Scientists, March 1981

== See also ==
- Program on Negotiation
- Vicente Blanco Gaspar
- Trolley problem

== Bibliography ==
- Fisher, Roger, ed. (1964). International Conflict and Behavioral Science: The Craigville Papers. New York: Basic.
- Fisher, Roger (1969). International Conflict for Beginners (foreword by Senator Edward M. Kennedy, illustrations by Robert C. Osborn). New York: Harper & Row.
- Fisher, Roger (1972). Dear Israelis, Dear Arabs: A Working Approach to Peace. New York: Harper & Row.
- Fisher, Roger (1978). International Crises and the Role of Law: Points of Choice. Oxford and New York: Oxford University Press.
- Fisher, Roger, and William Ury (1981). Getting to Yes: Negotiating Agreement Without Giving In. Boston: Houghton Mifflin.
- Fisher, Roger (1981). Improving Compliance with International Law. Charlottesville: University Press of Virginia.
- Fisher, Roger, and Scott Brown (1988). Getting Together: Building a Relationship That Gets to Yes. Boston: Houghton Mifflin. ISBN 9780395470992. (Published in 1989 as Getting Together: Building Relationships as We Negotiate. New York: Penguin. ISBN 9780140126389.)
- Fisher, Roger, William Ury, and Bruce Patton (1991). Getting to Yes: Negotiating Agreement Without Giving In, 2nd ed. New York: Penguin.
- Fisher, Roger, Elizabeth Kopelman, and Andrea Kupfer Schneider (1994). Beyond Machiavelli: Tools for Coping with Conflict. Cambridge: Harvard University Press.
- Fisher, Roger and Danny Ertel (1995). Getting Ready to Negotiate: The Getting to Yes Workbook. New York: Penguin.
- Fisher, Roger, Andrea Kupfer Schneider, Elizabeth Borgwardt, and Brian Ganson (1997). Coping with International Conflict: A Systematic Approach to Influence in International Negotiation. Upper Saddle River, NJ: Prentice Hall.
- Fisher, Roger, Alan Sharp, and John Richardson (1999). Getting It Done: How to Lead When You're Not in Charge. New York: HarperBusiness.
- Fisher, Roger, and Daniel Shapiro (2005). Beyond Reason: Using Emotions as You Negotiate. New York: Viking/Penguin.
- Fisher, Roger, William Ury, and Bruce Patton (2011). Getting to Yes: Negotiating Agreement Without Giving In, 3rd ed. New York: Penguin.
