= Carrie Menkel-Meadow =

American lawyer and scholar of dispute resolution

- Born: 1949 (age 76–77)
- Education: Barnard College; University of Pennsylvania Law School
- Occupations: Academic, lawyer
- Employer(s): University of California, Irvine School of Law
- Known for: Legal Scholarship on Dispute Resolution and Negotiation.

Carrie Menkel-Meadow is an American lawyer and scholar of dispute resolution. In 2018, she was the recipient of the Outstanding Scholar Award by the American Bar Foundation. The University of Chicago Law Review listed Menkel-Meadow as one of the most cited scholars of Critical Race Theory and Feminist Jurisprudence.

== Early life and education ==
Menkel-Meadow grew up in Queens, New York. She graduated with an A.B. in sociology, magna cum laude from Barnard College in 1971 and earned her J.D. cum laude from University of Pennsylvania Law School.

== Career ==
Menkel-Meadow was a Fulbright Scholar in 2007. She is a Distinguished Professor of Law at University of California, Irvine School of Law and the A.B. Chettle, Jr. Professor of Law, Emerita at the Georgetown University Law Center. From 1979 to 1999, Menkel-Meadow was a Professor at UCLA School of Law.

Menkel-Meadow is the author of International Conflict Resolution Processes (2025); Mediation and Its Applications for Good Decision Making and Dispute Resolution (2016); Negotiation: Processes for Problem Solving (2nd.ed 2014); Mediation: Theory, Policy & Practice (2nd ed. 2013); Dispute Resolution: Beyond the Adversarial Model (2nd ed. 2011); and Dispute Processing & Conflict Resolution (2003).
