= Negotiation theory =

Study of negotiations

The foundations of negotiation theory are decision analysis, behavioral decision-making, game theory, and negotiation analysis. Another classification of theories distinguishes between Structural Analysis, Strategic Analysis, Process Analysis, Integrative Analysis, and behavioral analysis of negotiations.

Negotiation is a strategic discussion that resolves an issue in a way that both parties find acceptable. Individuals should make separate, interactive decisions; and negotiation analysis considers how groups of reasonably bright individuals should and could make joint, collaborative decisions. These theories are interleaved and should be approached from the synthetic perspective.

== Common assumptions of most theories ==
Negotiation is a specialized and formal version of conflict resolution, most frequently employed when important issues must be agreed upon. Negotiation is necessary when one party requires the other party's agreement to achieve its aim. The aim of negotiating is to build a shared environment leading to long-term trust, and it often involves a third, neutral party to extract the issues from the emotions and keep the individuals concerned focused. It is a powerful method for resolving conflict and requires skill and experience. Henry Kissinger defined negotiation as "a process of combining conflicting positions into a common position under a decision rule of unanimity, a phenomenon in which the outcome is determined by the process." Druckman adds that negotiations pass through stages that consist of agenda-setting, a search for guiding principles, defining the issues, bargaining for favorable concession exchanges, and a search for implementing details. Transitions between stages are referred to as turning points.

Most theories of negotiations share the notion of negotiations as a process, but they differ in their description of the process.

Structural, strategic, and procedural analysis builds on rational actors, who are able to prioritize clear goals, are able to make trade-offs between conflicting values, are consistent in their behavioral patterns, and are able to take uncertainty into account.

Negotiations differ from mere coercion, in that negotiating parties have the theoretical possibility to withdraw from negotiations. It is easier to study bilateral negotiations, as opposed to multilateral negotiations.

== Structural analysis ==
Structural Analysis is based on a distribution of empowering elements among two negotiating parties. Structural theory moves away from traditional Realist notions of power in that it does not only consider power to be a possession, manifested for example in economic or military resources, but also thinks of power as a relation.

Based on the distribution of elements, in structural analysis we find either power-symmetry between equally strong parties or power-asymmetry between a stronger and a weaker party. All elements from which the respective parties can draw power constitute structure. They may be of material nature, i.e., hard power (such as weapons), or of social nature, i.e., soft power (such as norms, contracts, or precedents).

These instrumental elements of power, are either defined as parties’ relative position (resources position) or as their relative ability to make their options prevail.

According to structural analysis, negotiations can be described with matrices, such as the Prisoner's dilemma, a concept taken from game theory. Another common example is the game of Chicken.

Structural analysis is easy to criticize, because it predicts that the strongest will always win. This, however, does not always hold true.

== Strategic analysis ==
Strategic analysis starts with the assumption that both parties have a veto. Thus, in essence, negotiating parties can cooperate (C) or defect (D). Structural analysis then evaluates Á outcomes of negotiations (C, C; C, D; D, D; D, C), by assigning values to each of the possible outcomes. Often, cooperation of both sides yields the best outcome. The problem is that the parties can never be sure that the other is going to cooperate, mainly because of two reasons: first, decisions are made at the same time or, second, concessions of one side might not be returned. Therefore, the parties have contradicting incentives to cooperate or defect. If one party cooperates or makes a concession and the other does not, the defecting party might relatively gain more.

Trust may be built only in repetitive games through the emergence of reliable patterns of behavior, such as tit-for-tat.

== Process analysis ==
Process analysis is the theory closest to haggling. Process Analysis focuses on the study of the dynamics of processes. E.g., both Zeuthen and Cross tried to find a formula in order to predict the behavior of the other party in finding a rate of concession, in order to predict the likely outcome. Process analysis is the main resource in this chapter of negotiation.

The process of negotiation, therefore, is considered to unfold between fixed points: starting point of discord, endpoint of convergence. The so-called security point, which is the result of optional withdrawal, is also taken into account.

An important feature of negotiation processes is the idea of turning points (TPs). A considerable amount of research has been devoted to analyses of TPs in single and comparative case studies, as well as experiments. Considered as departures in the process, Druckman has proposed a three-part framework for analysis in which precipitating events precede (and cause) departures which have immediate and delayed consequences. Precipitating events can be external as when a mediator becomes involved, substantive as when a new idea is proposed, or procedural as when the formal plenary structure becomes divided into committees. Departures can be abrupt or relatively slow and consequences can escalate, moving away from agreement, or they might move in the direction of agreement. Using this framework in a comparative study of 34 cases, Druckman discovered that external events were needed to move talks on security or arms control toward agreement. However, new ideas or changed procedures were more important for progress in trade or political negotiations. Different patterns were also found for interest-based, cognitive-based, and values-based conflicts and between domestic and international negotiations.

Turning points are also analyzed in relation to negotiation crises or disruptions in the flow of the talks. Earlier research showed that TPs are more likely to occur in the context of crises, often in the form of changes that put the talks back on track and transition to a new stage (Druckman, 1986, 2001). A key to resolving crises is reframing the issues being discussed. The choice to reframe was shown to occur more frequently among negotiators when their trust is low and transaction costs are high. The research to date on TPs has generated ideas likely to stimulate further studies. Some of these ideas include a search for the underlying mechanisms that can explain the emergence of TPs. Foremost among these are flexibility and adaptability in response to crises or violations of expected behavior. The key challenge is to discover the conditions that foster progress toward a solution to the dilemma of balancing the desire to agree with the desire to come out favorably. For a review of the research on turning points, see Druckman and Olekalns.

== Integrative analysis ==
Integrative analysis divides the process into successive stages, rather than talking about fixed points. It extends analysis to pre-negotiations stages, in which parties make first contacts. The outcome is explained as the performance of the actors at different stages. Stages may include pre-negotiations, finding a formula of distribution, crest behavior, settlement

== Bad faith negotiation ==
Bad faith is a concept in negotiation theory whereby parties pretend to reason to reach settlement, but have no intention to do so, for example, one political party may pretend to negotiate, with no intention to compromise, for political effect.

=== Inherent bad faith model in international relations and political psychology ===
Bad faith in political science and political psychology refers to negotiating strategies in which there is no real intention to reach compromise, or a model of information processing. The "inherent bad faith model" of information processing is a theory in political psychology that was first put forth by Ole Holsti to explain the relationship between John Foster Dulles’ beliefs and his model of information processing. It is the most widely studied model of one's opponent. A state is presumed to be implacably hostile, and contra-indicators of this are ignored. They are dismissed as propaganda ploys or signs of weakness. Examples are John Foster Dulles’ position regarding the Soviet Union, or Israel's initial position on the Palestine Liberation Organization.

== See also ==
- Argumentation theory
- Dispute resolution
- List of books about negotiation
- Morphological analysis
- Negotiation
- Vicente Blanco Gaspar
