= Josef E. Fischer =

American surgeon (1937–2021)

Josef E. Fischer (1937–2021) was an American surgeon, scientist, and professor at Harvard Medical School.

== Biography ==
A native of Brooklyn, New York, Fischer was a summa cum laude graduate of Yeshiva University and a magna cum laude graduate of Harvard Medical School. He completed his internship and surgical residency at Massachusetts General Hospital in Boston, MA. From 1963 -1965 Fischer served as a Research Associate under Nobel Laureate Julius Axelrod at the National Institutes of Health and in 1968 began working as a Teaching Fellow in Surgery and Fellow of the American Cancer Society at Harvard Medical School.

Fischer joined the faculty of Harvard Medical School in 1970. He served as head of the Surgical Physiological Laboratory and Chief of the Hyperalimentation Unit at Massachusetts General Hospital before assuming the position of Christian R. Holmes Professor and Chairman of the Department of Surgery at University of Cincinnati College of Medicine in 1978. In addition to his responsibilities as chairman, Fischer served as a professor of molecular and cellular physiology and Associate Dean for Community Affairs at the University of Cincinnati College of Medicine.

In 2001 Fischer accepted the position of Chairman of the Department of Surgery and Surgeon-in-Chief at Beth Israel Deaconess Medical Center in Boston, MA and was appointed William V. McDermott Professor of Surgery at Harvard Medical School. Fischer recruited 29 surgeons in his first 3 years at Beth Israel Deaconess, which was key in mending the institution's finances, after a 1996 merger resulted in a loss of more than $280 Million for the hospital.

Fischer's research expertise includes nutritional support, cachexia, sepsis, enterocutaneous fistulas, and surgical education. In 1999 Fischer was one of 24 surgeons to be recognized by Archives of Surgery for having made "significant contributions to surgery in the areas of research, clinical care, and surgical education" in the 20th century.

Fischer published over 850 journal articles and edited 21 books including the standard surgical textbook, Mastery of Surgery. He has served on the editorial board for 13 journals including The American Journal of Surgery, Journal of American College of Surgeons, Archives of Surgery, Journal of Surgical Research, and Journal of Parenteral and Enteral Nutrition.

In 2008, Dr. Carol Warfield sued Beth Israel Deaconess Medical Center, Paul Levy, the former CEO of Beth Israel Deaconess Medical Center, Harvard Medical Faculty Physicians and Fischer for discrimination and retaliation. The parties resolved their dispute in February 2013 when Beth Israel Deaconess paid Warfield $7 million, clarified its policies and procedures for employees to report discrimination, agreed to sponsor a lecture series on women's health and women's achievement in surgery, and named the hospital's pain clinic in Warfield's honor. In reaching the agreement, the Defendants denied any wrongdoing in the matter and there was no judicial finding of wrongdoing on behalf of Fischer.

Fischer died in 2021.

== Offices ==
- Board of Directors, American Board of Surgery (1991–1997)
- Vice Chairman, American Board of Surgery (1996)
- Chairman, American Board of Surgery (1997–1998)
- Vice President, Halstead Society (1994)
- President, Halstead Society (1995–1996)
- President, Central Surgical Association
- Chairman, Society of Surgery of the Alimentary Tract (2003-2004)
- President, Society of Surgical Chairs (2000-2003)
- President, Surgical Infection Society (1995–1996)
- American College of Surgeons, Board of Governors (1991–1997)
- American College of Surgeons, Board of Regents (2000–2008)
- Chairman, American College of Surgeons, Board of Regents (2006–2008)

== Awards ==
- American Surgical Association Medallion for Surgical Research (2008)
- Distinguished Service Award of the American College of Surgeons (1997)

== Selected publications ==
- Fischer JE, Musacchio J, Kopin IJ, Axelrod J. : Effects of denervation on the uptake and beta-hydroxylation of tyramine in the rat salivary gland. Life Sci. 1964;3:413-9.
- Fischer JE, Bower RH, Atamian S, Welling R. Comparison of distal and proximal splenorenal shunts: a randomized prospective trial. Ann. Surg. 1981;194(4):531-44.
- Hasselgren PO, James JH, Fischer JE. Inhibited muscle amino acid uptake in sepsis. Ann. Surg. 1986;203(4):360-5.
- Hasselgren PO, Fischer JE. Muscle cachexia: current concepts of intracellular mechanisms and molecular regulation. Ann. Surg. 2001;233(1):9-17.
- Evenson AR, Fischer JE. Current management of enterocutaneous fistula. J Gastrointest Surg. 2006;10(3):455-64.
- Fischer JE. The impending disappearance of the general surgeon. JAMA. 2007;298(18):2191-3.
