= Paul Lévy =

Paul Lévy may refer to:

- Paul Lévy (mathematician) (1886–1971), French mathematician
- Paul Levy (journalist) (born 1941), US/British journalist and author
- Paul Alan Levy, American attorney
- Paul F. Levy, former president and CEO of Beth Israel Deaconess Medical Center
- Paul M. G. Lévy (1910–2002), Belgian journalist and professor
- General Levy (Paul Levy, born 1971), London born ragga vocalist
- Paul Bern (Paul Levy, 1889–1932), German-American film director, screenwriter and producer
- Paul Lhérie (Paul Lévy, 1844–1937), French opera singer
