= Earl Newsom =

American corporate public-image counselor (1897 to 1973)

Edwin Earl Newsom (1897–1973) was an American counselor in public relations. He is best known for the success of his public relations firm, Earl Newsom & Company (ENCO), which managed and counseled several large corporations in the midst of scandal and controversy. In the words of his biographer, Scott Cutlip, "He saw his role as a counsellor, not as an agent for a client. [He] did not issue press releases for clients or deal with the press in a public relations capacity."

Newsom believed that the American social model of self-governance put corporate virtue at a premium. He refuted Gustav Le Bon (1898) The Crowd – A Study of Public Mind, where the capacity of man to think collectively is denigrated. Newsom also maintained that "an enlightened and socially responsible performance is the only sound base for a favourable public relationship." Newsom has been recognized by The New York Times as being one of the most influential public relations counselors in the history of private industry.

== Early life and career ==
Earl Newsom was born in Wellman, Iowa, on December 13, 1897, to Reverend John Edward and Emma Day Newsom. He had two older brothers, both of whom worked as piano salesmen. Newsom eventually took up the trade also and developed the art of persuasion this way. Later, he went to Oberlin College. During World War I, he served in the Air Corps of the Navy. Returning to Oberlin, he graduated in 1921. For two years Newsom taught English at Western Reserve Academy in Hudson, Ohio. Newsom was in "endless search for mastery in the use of that thrilling phenomenon, the English sentence."

Earl Newsom married Lois Ruth Rinehart on June 14, 1923. The couple moved to New York City where Newsom taught English and mathematics at McBurney School. For a time, he also studied English literature at Columbia University as a graduate student.

In 1925, Newsom started working for the Literary Digest. In 1927, he was involved in the home heating industry as coal furnaces were replaced by oil heaters. He took a position with the Oil Heating Institute, promoting the term oil heater over oil burner, and the conversion of the old coal room to a "basement playroom". In 1931, returned to publishing with the John Day company. Among his projects was putting The Good Earth into print.

== Disposition and appearance ==
Earl Newsom was known for his love of writing and the English language. He was regarded as being scholarly, humorous, and charming. He was neither greedy nor money hungry, and he developed trusted relationships with his clients. Physically, Newsom resembled Abraham Lincoln; he was tall, dark and "craggy." Fittingly, Newsom admired Lincoln and kept a portrait of the former president behind his desk. He frequently quoted Lincoln stating, "You can't fool all the people all the time."

== Development of ENCO ==
In 1935, Newsom, Fred Palmer, and J. Hardly Wright came together and developed their own public relations firm. After Palmer and Wright dropped out, Newsom renamed the firm in his name, calling it Earl Newsom & Company (ENCO).

ENCO took a different approach than many other public relations firms at that time. ENCO's services included helping organizations and businesses create their own internal public relations departments; writing, editing, and the publication of written materials; and research. Every ENCO employee also worked on every single account.

The ENCO operation involved research, including polls of Elmo Roper, planning, editing corporate materials, and executive search to post appropriate personnel with the client corporation. With these services, communication, and education, ENCO was able to empower their clients with means in the public relations field.

Newsom did not retire until 1966. On 25 January 1963 Scott Cutlip conducted an interview with Newsom. In 1994 Cutlip included three chapters on Newsom's life and work in the book The Unseen Power. Cutlip reports that Newsom was one of those who believe that "to earn a good reputation a client's conduct must merit such a reputation".

Plagued by health problems all of his life, Earl Newsom died April 11, 1973, in Sharon, Connecticut, after a six-week battle with a brain tumor. In 1983, ENCO merged with Adams & Rinehart.

== Client work ==
Newsom and his firm counseled several big-named clients, including Campbell's, Merrill Lynch, Price Waterhouse, Macy's, and Eli Lilly and Company. The following are some of the highlights of Newsom's work with several other companies:

One of Newsom's earliest clients was Standard Oil of New Jersey or SONJ. The corporation had been castigated in 1933 by Ida Tarbell. Furthermore, patents on butyl-rubber, essential to getting the army rolling, were not licensed in America before 25 March 1942, but had been licensed to I. G. Farben. Thus, Newsom oversaw the formation of a Business History Foundation to generate a positive business history. Henrietta Larsen and NSB Gras were hired to begin the assembly of materials for a corporate history. With the help of professional authors, the company published its story in a volume covering 1882 to 1911, another to 1927, and a volume to 1950.

Additionally, the company began to publish a polished journal entitled The Lamp that was distributed to different contributing publics. And beginning in 1945, the new internal public relations department began funding films as educational tools. Louisiana Story by Robert Flaherty was the most famous film and gleaned great reward of SONJ. Publication of a periodical entitled Photo Memo, which was filled with paintings and documentary stills produced by leading artists and photographers, was distributed among "teachers, librarians, and other opinion leaders." It was designed to show how SONJ had developed over time. Newsom reached out to educators by demanding the preparation of reprints and booklets that could be utilized in science classes. At Newsom's recommendation, SONJ produced 3 post-WWII ads which were aimed at informing returning soldiers of postwar opportunities. For a live event, the "Jersey Roundtable" annually brought together 25 academics in a contemporary dialogue.

In 1945 Newsom heard through Elmo Roper that Henry Ford II was seeking counsel. Newsom took on the task of casting him as "one of a new generation of industrial statesmen". He had Henry give speeches. He also helped him see that Ford could weather a period of manufacturing at a loss during the restoration of car-manufacture plants from service as military-vehicle factory. Alfred A. May was hired in 1944 by Ford to begin to repair the damage of Henry Ford's newspaper Dearborn Independent. Newsom held "that there are no quick fixes for longstanding problems and that actions taken must be in keeping with the character of the personalities and organization". Tasked particularly with Jewish relations, Alfred May stayed with Ford until 1974.

Another automotive giant approached Newsom for public relations help as well. General Motors' Corvair model was criticized as being unsafe and lawsuits ensued. The death of 16-yr-old Don Wells Lyford brought scrutiny to the innovative rear engine Corvair, but the court ruled that the car was not a defective product. Unfortunately, the PR damage was done. GM hired Newsom, but the relationship was short and rocky. GM's internal PR staff saw Newsom's staff as the enemy and did not cooperate or heed Newsom's advice. After continuously being undercut by the internal PR department Newsom cancelled the account in 1967.

In the 1950s, John D. Rockefeller came to Newsom with questions about his continuing support of Colonial Williamsburg. Rockefeller wanted a clearer understanding of the significance of Williamsburg. Newsom surveyed the staff of Colonial Williamsburg. In 1951, the Newsom organization released a report entitled "Colonial Williamsburg, The First Twenty-Five Years" which documented the restoration of the historic town. Newsom provided Rockefeller with speeches. In 1963, in response to charges criticizing philanthropic organizations Newsom prepared reports that documented the philanthropic service done by the Rockefeller Foundation. The relationship was very close between the two men.

Newsom and his firm were also retained by Columbia Broadcasting System, specifically to help mediate the growing tension between Edward Murrow and two top CBS officials. After a scandal broke when Murrow's quiz show The $64,000 Question was found to be rigged, Newsom developed a plan to regain the public's trust and ensured the public that there would be no more deception. Newsom also continued to ease relations between Murrow and CBS officials, and wrote speeches on behalf of the station.

In addition to all of these corporations, Newsom also provided counsel to several Republican leaders, including President Dwight D. Eisenhower and then Vice President Richard Nixon.
