= William Stickney =

William Stickney may refer to:

- William Stickney (golfer), American golfer
- William W. Stickney (politician) (William Wallace Stickney), American lawyer and politician in Vermont
- William W. Stickney (USMC) (William Wallace Stickney), United States Marine Corps general and lawyer
- William Weir Stickney, American attorney and politician in New Hampshire
- William Stickney (board of directors member), member of the board of directors of the Columbia Institution for the Deaf
