= Michael Wheeler =

Michael or Mike Wheeler may refer to:

- Michael A. Wheeler (born 1943), teacher at Harvard Business School
- Michael Wheeler (athlete) (1935–2020), British sprinter
- Michael Brian Wheeler, United States Army Reserve officer, charged with fraud
- Michael Mortimer Wheeler (1915–1992), British lawyer
- Michael Wheeler-Booth (1934–2018), UK civil servant in the House of Lords
- Michael Wheeler (philosopher) (born 1960), British philosopher
- Michael Wheeler (politician), British Member of Parliament
- Mike Wheeler (NASCAR) (born 1978), American racing crew chief
- Mike Wheeler (musician) (born 1961), American blues songwriter and guitarist
- Mike Wheeler (Stranger Things), a fictional character
