= 1994–95 NHL lockout =

Sports labor dispute

- Date: October 1, 1994 – January 11, 1995 (3 months, 1 week and 3 days)
- Location: United States; Canada
- Caused by: Expiration of the 1992 NHL Collective Bargaining Agreement in September 1993; 1993–94 season played without a collective bargaining agreement in place; Failure to reach a new agreement ahead of the 1994–95 season
- Goals: Salary cap; Revenue sharing
- Result: NHL and NHLPA reach an agreement to end the lockout on January 11 with a collective bargaining agreement that does not include a salary cap; 1994–95 season begins on January 20; season reduced from 84 to 48 games per team; Agreement that resolved the lockout would expire on September 15, 2004, triggering a lockout that would eventually cancel the entire 2004–05 season

Parties
National Hockey League Players' Association (NHLPA)	National Hockey League (NHL)

Lead figures
Bob Goodenow (executive director)	Gary Bettman (commissioner)

The 1994–95 NHL lockout was a lockout that came after a year of National Hockey League (NHL) hockey that was played without a collective bargaining agreement. The lockout was a subject of dispute as the players sought collective bargaining and owners sought to help franchises that had a weaker market as well as make sure they could cap the rising salaries of players. The lockout caused the 1994–95 season to be delayed and shortened to 48 games instead of 84 or 82, the shortest season in 53 years.

== Background ==
Much like the 2004–05 NHL lockout a decade later, the big issue was the implementation of a salary cap. The NHL owners were strongly in favor of the cap while the players were opposed to it. The NHL wanted to levy a luxury tax, a financial penalty that is assigned by the league, on salaries that were higher than the average. However, the National Hockey League Players' Association (NHLPA) viewed that as a variation on a salary cap and refused to accept it. This came right off the heels of the 1992 walkout by players, which interrupted the race for the Stanley Cup.

This 3 month, 1 week, and 3 day lockout stretched from October 1, 1994, to January 11, 1995. A total of 468 games were lost due to the lockout, along with the All-Star Game. Unlike the league's future lockouts, the players went to training camp as if to start the season. However, as these camps came to a close it was obvious that there was to be labor talks in the near future.

=== The issues at hand ===
As previously noted, the NHL wanted to levy a luxury tax on salaries that were higher than the average and the NHLPA viewed that as a variation on a salary cap and refused to accept it. Unlike in the 1992 strike, it was the owners who wanted to make sure that they got the right deal, setting the opening position for new commissioner Gary Bettman. There were a few issues that the owners wanted to work out, most of which revolved around salary caps, free agency and hoping to limit escalating salaries. Bettman's "NHL mandate was: aggressive expansion, a new American TV deal, a focus on growth (especially in the southern U.S.), and lasting labor peace ... under the owners' terms, of course.". It was widely assumed that to reach this peace a salary cap would have to be in place. Bettman's insisted the owners' plan was merely a tax plan, but would result the same as a salary cap.

Under the leadership of executive director Bob Goodenow, the NHLPA position was that it would be open to a small tax, however the bulk of the financial goals could be achieved through revenue sharing. Going into the negotiations both the players and the owners agreed on one big issue, the small market franchises. The NHL wanted to tie salaries to revenue in order to subsidize the operation of weaker teams, while the NHLPA sought revenue sharing to help the smaller market teams.

The lockout attracted the attention of worldwide negotiation experts. An op-ed article in The New York Times by James K. Sebenius and his colleague Prof. Michael A. Wheeler brought to prominence a suggestion from fellow professors Howard Raiffa and David Lax: Revenue should flow into a separate escrow account touched by neither players nor owners until the dispute was resolved. This suggestion was not adopted.

After the lockout had dragged on, the talk of salary cap faded and new items entered the debate. Talk of rookie salary cap, changes to the arbitration system, and loosened free agency. However, large market teams such as Toronto, Detroit, the New York Rangers, Dallas, and Philadelphia eventually broke with the league, as they feared that an extended lockout would outweigh the benefits from getting a salary cap and didn't want to be the first league in North America to forfeit an entire season just to help out their small-market colleagues.

== The 4-on-4 Challenge ==
While some NHL players decided to play in various European leagues, others decided to remain in North America. Around that time, the "4-on-4 Challenge" (i.e. four players and a goalie on the ice) was initiated. This NHLPA organized tournament was played over the course of three days (10–12 November 1994) during the owners' lockout of 1994–95; all the games were played in Hamilton, Ontario's Copps Coliseum. In the end, Team Ontario defeated Team USA, Team Western Canada and Team Quebec to win the tournament, which raised more than half a million dollars to support the Ronald McDonald Children's Charities of Canada and minor hockey associations throughout North America. Many NHL superstars, notably Patrick Roy, Luc Robitaille, Brett Hull, Joe Sakic, Doug Gilmour, Rob Blake and Mike Richter, took part in this competition.

Also in the meantime, Wayne Gretzky and some friends formed the Ninety Nine All Stars Tour and played some exhibition games in various countries.

== The end of the lockout ==
The lockout ended on January 11, 1995. As a result, the league shortened the season length from 84 games, the length of the previous two seasons, to 48. Furthermore, the season would last from January 20 to May 3; this was the first time in NHL history that the regular season extended into May. Regular-season games would be limited to intra-conference play (Eastern Conference teams did not play Western Conference teams). During the lockout, the NHL and NHLPA agreed to shorten future seasons to 82 games. San Jose, which was to host the All-Star game that year, was awarded the 1997 game instead.

The lockout would eventually contribute in part to two Canadian teams moving to the United States—the Quebec Nordiques moved to Denver in the summer of 1995 and became the Colorado Avalanche, and the original Winnipeg Jets moved to Phoenix and became the Phoenix Coyotes in the summer of 1996. The Hartford Whalers became the Carolina Hurricanes in 1997. The Avalanche and Hurricanes would win the Stanley Cup within the next decade.

Eventually there was another lockout in 2004–05, which resulted in that season being canceled altogether. On September 16, 2012 another lockout started, but it ended on January 6, 2013. The 1994–95 lockout had created resentment between the players and owners. When the next lockout happened in 2004 the owners attempted to come down hard on the players. In the end a salary cap for rookies was instituted, and all players signing a rookie contract needed to sign two-way contracts which allowed teams to send them down to minor league teams at minor league-level pay rather than the pay rate they received while playing for the parent NHL club. The league had expanded by four teams and began to participate in the Olympics. The league was to extend the CBA twice to ensure labor peace during that time. However salaries continued to rise, eventually hitting an average of $1.8 million and this was key in setting up the issues in the 2004–05 lockout.
