= Carol A. Warfield =

Carol Anastasia Warfield is an American anesthesiologist and professor at Harvard Medical School specializing in pain management.

== Biography ==
A native of Boston, Massachusetts, Warfield has served on the faculty of Harvard Medical School since 1978. She was appointed Edward Lowenstein Professor in Anaesthesia in 2000. At the time of her appointment, she was one of only 13 women holding endowed professorships at Harvard Medical School. Dr. Warfield served as director of the Pain Management Center at Beth Israel Deaconess Medical Center (renamed the Arnold-Warfield Pain Management Center in 2013) and its predecessor Beth Israel Hospital from 1980 until 2007 and as Chief of Anesthesia for the hospital from 2000 onwards.

== Publications ==
Warfield has authored two textbooks on pain management, Principles and Practice of Pain Medicine, and the Manual of Pain Management as well as over 100 academic publications.

== Lawsuit ==
In 2008, Warfield filed a lawsuit against Beth Israel Deaconess Medical Center, former Beth Israel CEO Paul F. Levy, Harvard Medical Faculty Physicians, and Josef E. Fischer alleging gender-based discrimination, retaliation, and defamation in connection with Beth Israel's decision to terminate Warfield's appointment in 2007. Warfield alleged that during the preceding several years, Fischer engaged in a relentless pattern of gender-based discriminatory treatment of her, and that she repeatedly complained to Levy about Fischer's treatment, but that no or insufficient action was taken.

The parties settled out of court in February 2013. While the defendants admitted no wrongdoing, under the terms of the settlement Beth Israel Deaconess paid Warfield $7 million, named the hospital’s pain clinic in her honor, and agreed to sponsor an annual lecture series on women’s health and the academic contributions of women in surgery. The case and its settlement attracted considerable local media attention due to the large settlement amount and the fact that the settlement was made public.
