= Amos Kendall =

American lawyer, journalist and politician (1789–1869)

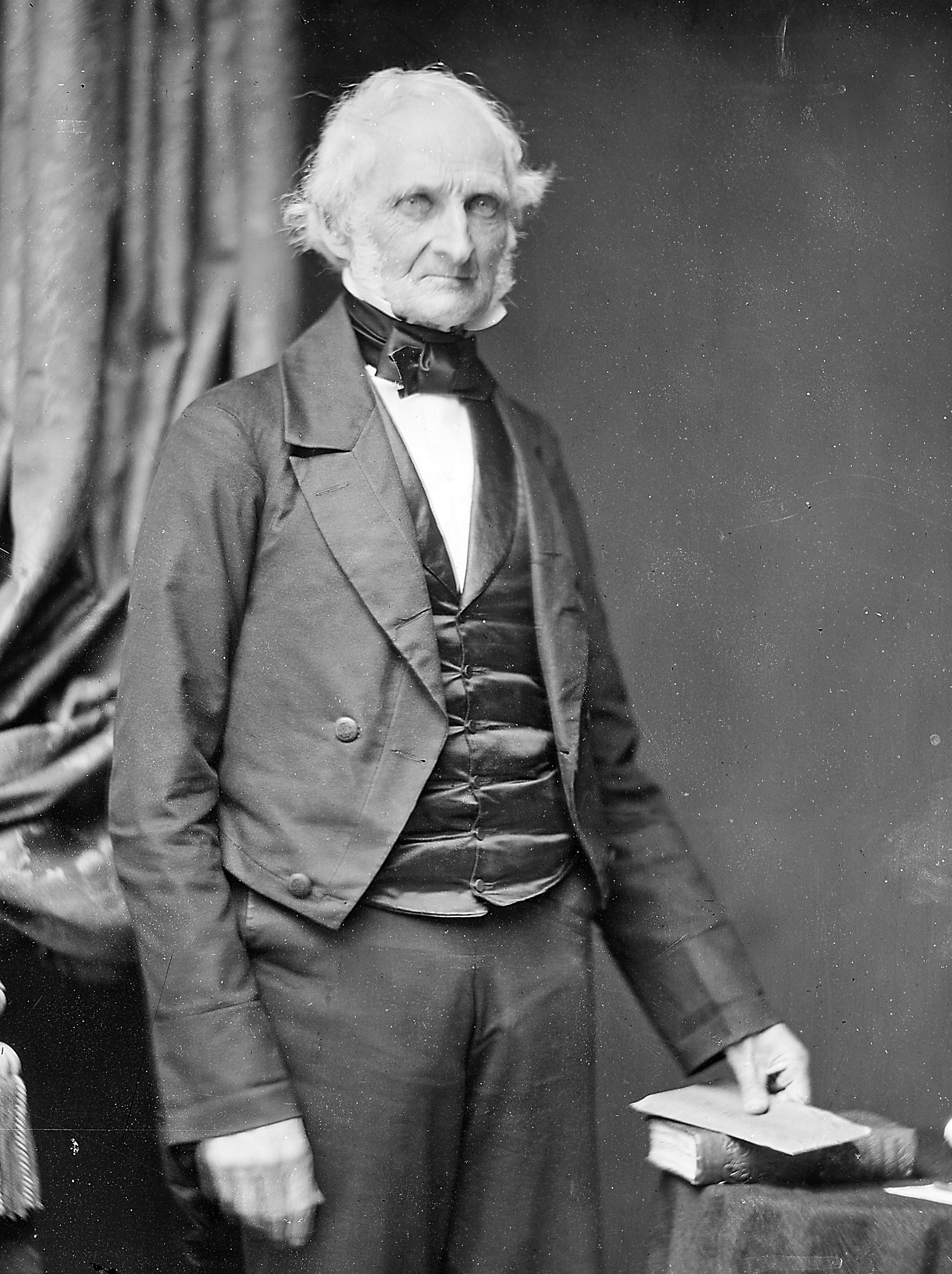
- Portrait by Mathew Brady, c. 1860

8th United States Postmaster General
- In office May 1, 1835 – May 18, 1840
- President: Andrew Jackson; Martin Van Buren
- Preceded by: William T. Barry
- Succeeded by: John Milton Niles

Personal details
- Born: August 16, 1789 Dunstable, Massachusetts, U.S.
- Died: November 12, 1869 (aged 80) Washington, D.C., U.S.
- Party: Democratic
- Spouses: Mary Woolfolk (m. 1818; died 1823); Jane Kyle (m. 1826; died 1864)
- Education: Dartmouth College (BA)

Amos Kendall (August 16, 1789 – November 12, 1869) was an American lawyer, journalist and politician. He rose to prominence as editor-in-chief of the Argus of Western America, an influential newspaper in Frankfort, the capital of the U.S. state of Kentucky. He used his newspaper, writing skills, and extensive political contacts to build the Democratic Party into a national political power.

An ardent supporter of Andrew Jackson, he was appointed and served as United States Postmaster General during the Jackson and Martin Van Buren administrations. He was one of the most influential members of Jackson's "Kitchen Cabinet", an unofficial group of Jackson's top appointees and advisors who set administration policy. Returning to private life, Kendall wrote one of the first biographies of Jackson, which was published in 1843. He invested significantly in Samuel Morse's new invention, the telegraph. He became one of the most important figures in the transformation of the American news media in the 19th century.

== Early life and education ==
=== Early life ===
Amos Kendall was born in Dunstable, Massachusetts, on August 16, 1789 (although some sources say 1787). He was the sixth child of Zebedee and Molly (Dakin) Kendall. The Kendalls had immigrated to the Massachusetts Bay Colony from England in 1640. The Kendalls became prominent landowners in the town of Dunstable, and established a large family. Members of his family owned the tavern where elections and town meetings were held, were elected town selectmen, and served on the committee of correspondence (the shadow-government which mobilized anti-British sentiment prior to the American Revolutionary War). His mother Molly Kendall gave birth to six more children after Amos, but only two of them lived past the age of six.

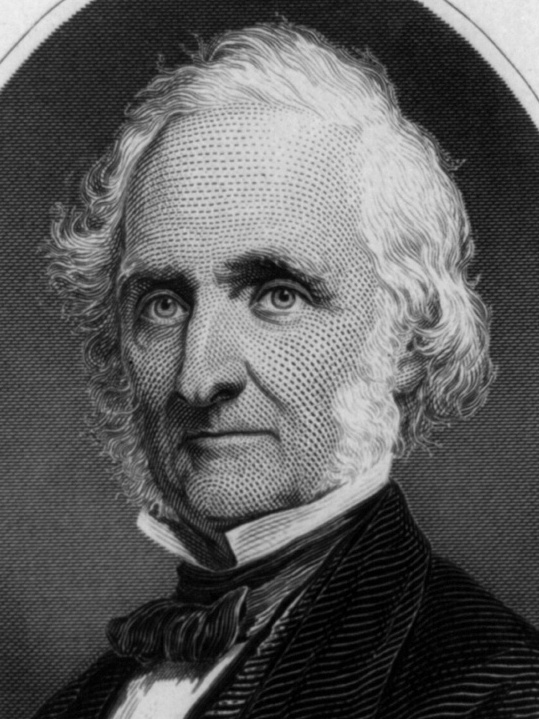
Amos Kendall in U.S. Treasury engraved portrait

Two years after Amos was born, Zebedee Kendall was named a deacon of the local Congregational church. The Kendalls were very religious, and family life was strict. Kendall's early years were spent working on the family farm, an average-sized property which had 22 acres (89,000 m^{2}) of arable land. The farm primarily raised sheep and dairy cattle and provided pasture for the family horses and oxen (which were used for plowing fields). The family also cultivated corn, flax, hay, potatoes, and rye. A small part of the land was devoted to growing tobacco. Amos also assisted in clearing rocks from the farmland (which was extremely rocky and full of clay), and mending stone and split-rail fences. Amos was a sickly child, thin and prone to colds and severe headaches.

Amos Kendall attended free public elementary schools in Massachusetts and New Hampshire during two months each summer, and was a frequent user of the subscription library in Dunstable, Massachusetts (where his father had the right to check out two books a month).

Kendall attended the New Ipswich Academy in New Ipswich, New Hampshire, for a few weeks in the fall of 1805, and a free public secondary school in New Ipswich for a month in the winter of 1806. In April 1806, he re-entered New Ipswich Academy, paying tuition by working at manual labor. He remained there until the fall, then studied a few weeks in December 1806 at a free public school in Dunstable. At the age of 16, Amos's education was advanced enough that his father obtained a two-month teaching position for him at a school in Reading, Massachusetts, in summer 1806 and another in the fall at a public school in Dunstable, New Hampshire (now known as Nashua).

Amos entered the Lawrence Academy at Groton in Groton, Massachusetts, in April 1807. Despite poor health, he felt prepared to apply to Dartmouth College. He succeeded, and was admitted to Dartmouth on September 10, 1807.

=== College education ===
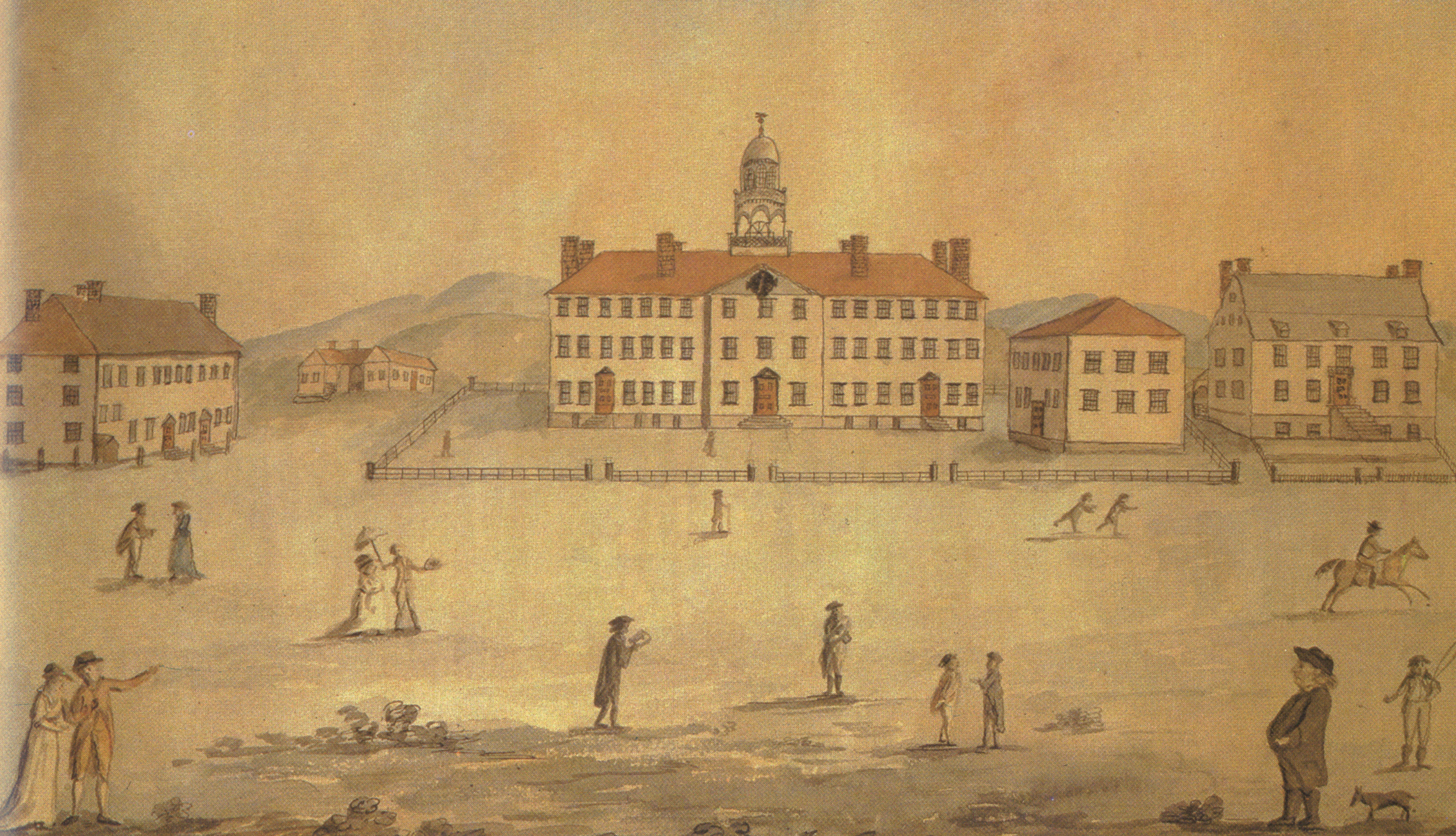
Dartmouth College in the early 1800s

Unable to afford the $80 to $90 cost of the fall and winter term, his father Zebedee obtained another teaching position for Amos at a school in Dunstable. Away from his father's control for an extended period of time, Kendall began to play cards, dance, and occasionally drink alcohol. With money in hand, he entered Dartmouth in March 1808. Kendall joined the Social Friends, a fraternal society, as well as a small, semi-secret study and debating society known as the Gymnasion Adelphon. Through the college's and society's libraries, he had access to more than 4,000 books (a huge number by the standards of the day), many of which were by recent authors and in fields which he had been unable to study while under his father's strict moral supervision. Kendall later said that the informal education he received through reading and discussion outside the classroom was more productive than the formal classes he attended.

Kendall spent the fall and winter terms of 1808 teaching in New Ipswich and began attending classes again at Dartmouth in March 1809. When the college banned on-campus drinking, students blamed Kendall — who had circulated a petition to have it stopped. He was bullied and nearly assaulted on several occasions, and some students attempted to injure him by dropping heavy roof timbers onto him as he exited a building. Kendall would have left Dartmouth if not for the support of the members of the Gymnasion Adelphon. He later admitted that he learned a valuable lesson from the experience: Never attempt to impose his moral values on others. In July 1809 he joined the Handel Society, and regularly participated in their productions. He taught again in Ipswich from November 1809 to February 1810 to earn money for college.

Returning to Dartmouth in the spring of 1810, Kendall's social standing at school improved. He participated in a prank in which the cattle of the townspeople were herded into a basement room at the college. When several students were brought up on charges, Kendall defended them so ably that the charges were dropped. Kendall, like most people from Dunstable, was a member of the Democratic-Republican Party. But most students at Dartmouth belonged to the Federalist Party. When asked to provide an oration at the Independence Day celebrations in 1810, he declined by arguing that the Federalists were taking over the event. When he was embraced by the radical Democratic-Republicans, he refused their support by announcing that he found them too "Frenchified" (e.g., too supportive of Napoleonic France and not patriotic enough). His determination to stand his ground but not embrace radicalism won him a great deal of admiration. Kendall taught school again during winter term 1810–1811.

Kendall returned to Dartmouth in March 1811. During his senior year, Kendall joined the Philoi Euphradias literary society, joined Phi Beta Kappa society, and was elected first in his class by his classmates. He graduated from Dartmouth at the top of his class on August 27, 1811.

== Legal education, the Clay children, and legal practice ==
=== Legal education ===
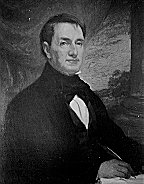
William M. Richardson

Shortly before graduation, Kendall traveled to Groton, Massachusetts, to seek a teaching position. He met with William M. Richardson, a prominent local attorney and friend of his father's. Richardson advised Kendall to abandon teaching and to study law. He became a legal apprentice in Richardson's legal practice on September 4, 1811. Since Richardson's current apprentice would not leave until March 1812, Kendall resolved to live in Groton. All able-bodied men were required to join the local militia, and Kendall did so eagerly since his father had been a militiaman. But musters left him physically exhausted for days, he fainted at the sight of blood, and was so unable to withstand physical pain that he fainted when pricked with a needle. A physician certified him as unable to perform his duties. But when funds ran out, he spent the winter of 1811–1812 at home reading law books and performing chores for his father.

Kendall suffered a bout of "lung fever" (most likely community-acquired pneumonia) in June 1813 that left him bedridden for three weeks. In addition, he suffered such severe migraines that he could not tolerate loud sounds.

=== Teaching the children of Henry Clay ===
In the fall of 1813, Richardson announced that he was leaving Groton. Although Richardson offered to secure Kendall an apprenticeship with the attorney taking over his practice, Kendall declined the offer. Kendall decided that, with an economic depression afflicting New England and his only patron leaving, it was time to leave Massachusetts. He resolved to relocate to Washington, D.C., and arrived in the city on March 2, 1814.

Introduced to numerous politicians by William M. Richardson, who had been elected to the United States House of Representatives, Kendall was hired by Senator Jesse Bledsoe of Kentucky to tutor the Bledsoe children. He left Washington on March 9, traveling by stagecoach to Pittsburgh, Pennsylvania, and then by flatboat down the Ohio River to Cincinnati, Ohio. He largely walked the 85 miles (137 km) south to Lexington, Kentucky, reaching the city on April 12.

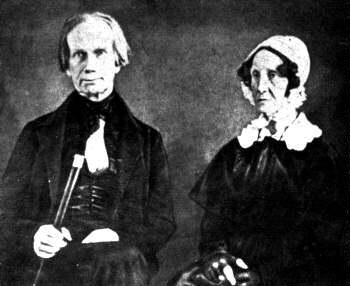
One of the few images of Lucretia Hart Clay, depicted with her husband, Henry Clay

Kendall claims that, upon arrival in Lexington, Senator Bledsoe hinted that he no longer wanted to use Kendall's services. Other sources, however, claim that Bledsoe's family had not been told of the senator's decision to hire Kendall as a tutor and refused to allow him in the home. Kendall angrily resolved to have nothing to do with Bledsoe. On April 27,

Kendall met John Watkins, the younger half-brother of Henry Clay, the powerful Speaker of the House of Representatives. Watkins, a law student, frequented the same tavern as Kendall, and quickly introduced Kendall to Henry Clay's wife, Lucretia. With seven children and both parents frequently absent from the Clay estate, Ashland, the Clays needed someone who could help maintain order in the family as well as educate the children. Mrs. Clay offered Kendall room, board, use of her husband's extensive library, and $300 a year (nearly three times as much as Bledsoe had promised). He eagerly accepted the offer and began his duties on May 5.

Kendall spent only a year teaching the Clay children. Twelve-year-old Theodore exhibited violent rages and threatened the life of a slave with a knife, which foreshadowed the insanity which claimed him in 1833. Eleven-year-old Thomas threw extreme temper tantrums and often hurled abuse at Kendall. (Thomas suffered from severe depression throughout adulthood.) Neither boy was interested in studies, and Mrs. Clay was reluctant to rein them in. But Kendall's influence slowly exerted itself, and all the school-age Clay children began to show improvement in their studies and behavior. Additionally, Mrs. Clay taught Kendall many of the social skills his upbringing had not: How to walk with confidence, enter a room with flair, make small talk, and dance better. Although Kendall was shy and socially awkward, he began to impress acquaintances with his education, intellect, and penchant for reading and writing poetry.

=== Establishing a legal practice ===
Determined to avoid teaching as a long-term career option, Kendall applied for a license to practice law in Kentucky. On October 12, 1814, he traveled to the state capital of Frankfort to present himself for examination before the Kentucky Court of Appeals. He asked Major William Barry (whom he had traveled with part of the way from Pennsylvania to Kentucky) to introduce him to the judges, but Barry did not appear. He asked Frankfort lawyer, Robert Wickliffe, to introduce him, but Wickliffe could not be found. Kendall introduced himself to the judges, and spent about an hour that night under examination. He was examined further in the morning. Kendall made so many errors (many of them in response to simple questions) that he feared he would not obtain the law license. But Barry and Wickliffe both appeared at midday and spoke privately with the judge examiners, and Kendall was granted his license that afternoon. He swore the legal oath on March 21, 1815. Kendall quit his employment with the Clays on April 29, 1814.

Believing he could not establish a legal practice in Lexington, Kendall resolved to move to an adjacent community. He explored the towns of Richmond, Nicholasville, Georgetown, and Versailles, and took up residence in Georgetown on May 10, 1815. On June 3, Kendall attended a Democratic-Republican meeting at the home of Representative Richard Mentor Johnson. Johnson was deeply impressed with Kendall's writing, and offered to sell him the local Democratic-Republican newspaper, Georgetown Minerva. Kendall declined to buy the paper, but agreed to become its editor-in-chief.

== Marriage and children ==
Amos Kendall was markedly shy. In part, he had never learned social graces in his family during childhood and adolescence. He did not actively participate in social gatherings until he moved to Groton, Massachusetts, in 1811. There, he fell in love with 16-year-old Eliza, the sister of a prominent Boston family of merchants. She refused his attentions (as she was too young to marry), and Kendall wooed her older sister, Mary. But the loss of his legal apprenticeship and subsequent move to Kentucky in 1813 ended their relationship.

After getting more established in Kentucky, Kendall married Mary Bullard Woolfolk of Louisville, on October 1, 1818. The couple had four children: Mary Anne (born in 1820), a stillborn boy, Adela (born in 1822), and William Zebedee (born in 1823). On October 13, 1823, Mary died of a fever after a 10-day illness.

On January 5, 1826, Kendall married 17-year-old Jane Kyle of Georgetown, Kentucky. They had four sons and seven daughters together.

== Career as journalist and Postmaster General ==
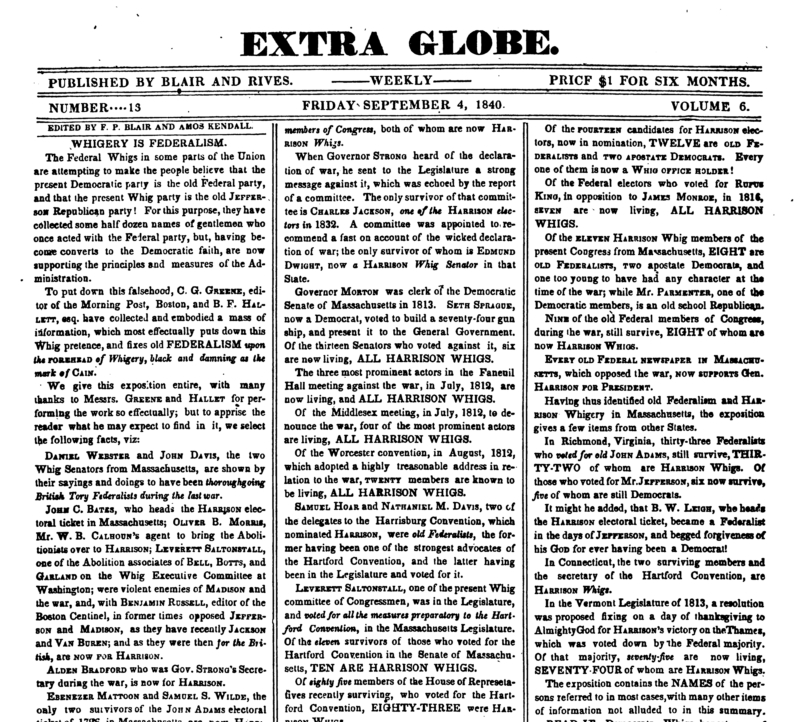
Front page of the Extra Globe for September 4, 1840

Before taking up his duties as editor of the Minerva, Kendall traveled to Lexington to attend a court session. He fell violently ill (possibly with hepatitis). Alone and unable to care for himself in his boardinghouse room, he nearly died. But Lucretia Clay learned of his illness and brought him to Ashland. For the next month, she nursed him back to health. He was well enough to return to Georgetown on July 15.

In September 1815, Kendall agreed to purchase a half-interest in the Georgetown Minerva. Johnson allowed him to pay the purchase price of $1,000 in equal installments over the next five years, without interest. Kendall also agreed to buy the position of US postmaster of the town from its current office-holder for $720 over four years. (He hoped that this position would give him early access to news). He briefly committed to teaching and investing in land speculation before backing out of both proposals. He quickly learned that Johnson had mortgaged his half of the business to a brother-in-law, Robert Ward, and sold $800 of Kendall's promissory note to his brother, James Johnson. After an exchange of angry letters, James Johnson cancelled Kendall's debt, took possession of the Minerva, and agreed to let Kendall edit a new newspaper he was founding (the Georgetown Patriot).

Kendall began publishing the Georgetown Patriot in 1816. In October 1816, he moved to the state capital, Frankfort. He became part owner and editor-in-chief of the Argus of Western America.

In 1829, Kendall was appointed Fourth Auditor of the United States Department of the Treasury and moved to Washington, DC. He soon discovered evidence of embezzlement by his predecessor, Tobias Watkins, which led to a high-profile trial at Andrew Jackson's behest. The following year, Jackson supporters won control of the Washington Globe newspaper in Washington, D.C. The newspaper became the house organ of the Jackson administration, and Kendall brought Jackson's nephew, Francis Preston Blair, to Washington to be the paper's editor-in-chief. Along with men such as Blair, Duff Green, Isaac Hill, and William Berkeley Lewis, Kendall was a member of Jackson's Kitchen Cabinet.

Over time, Kendall came to dominate the Kitchen Cabinet. He had arguably more influence over Jackson than any other Cabinet official or Kitchen Cabinet member. Kendall took many of Jackson's ideas about government and national policy and refashioned them into highly polished, erudite official government statements and newspaper articles. These were published in the Globe and other newspapers, enhancing President Jackson's reputation as an intellectual. Kendall also drafted most of Jackson's five annual messages to Congress, and his statement vetoing the renewal of the charter of the Second Bank of the United States in 1832.

Kendall was appointed U.S Postmaster General on May 1, 1835. During his time in office, he worked to eliminate corruption in the Post Office Department. He also manipulated operations of the Post Office Department so that western newspapers (which tended to support Jackson) were delivered faster and received better service than eastern ones. Despite having no legal basis for his action, he also allowed postal officials in the Deep South to refuse to deliver abolitionist literature.

Suffering from extreme poor health, he resigned as Postmaster General effective May 18, 1840. John Quincy Adams, a bitter foe of both Jackson and Van Buren, confided to his diary in December 1840 that he believed both men had been "for twelve years the tool of Amos Kendall, the ruling mind of their dominion." Kendall wrote extensively for the Washington Extra Globe newspaper in the summer and fall of 1840 in an unsuccessful effort to boost Van Buren's chances for re-election.

Jackson, meanwhile, was interested in finding someone to write a biography of his life. He eventually settled on Kendall, who accepted the task. Of the projected 15 volumes, Kendall wrote seven volumes of approximately 30 pages each before abandoning the project. The part that was published encompasses Jackson's life until the end of the Creek War in 1814.

== Post-government career ==
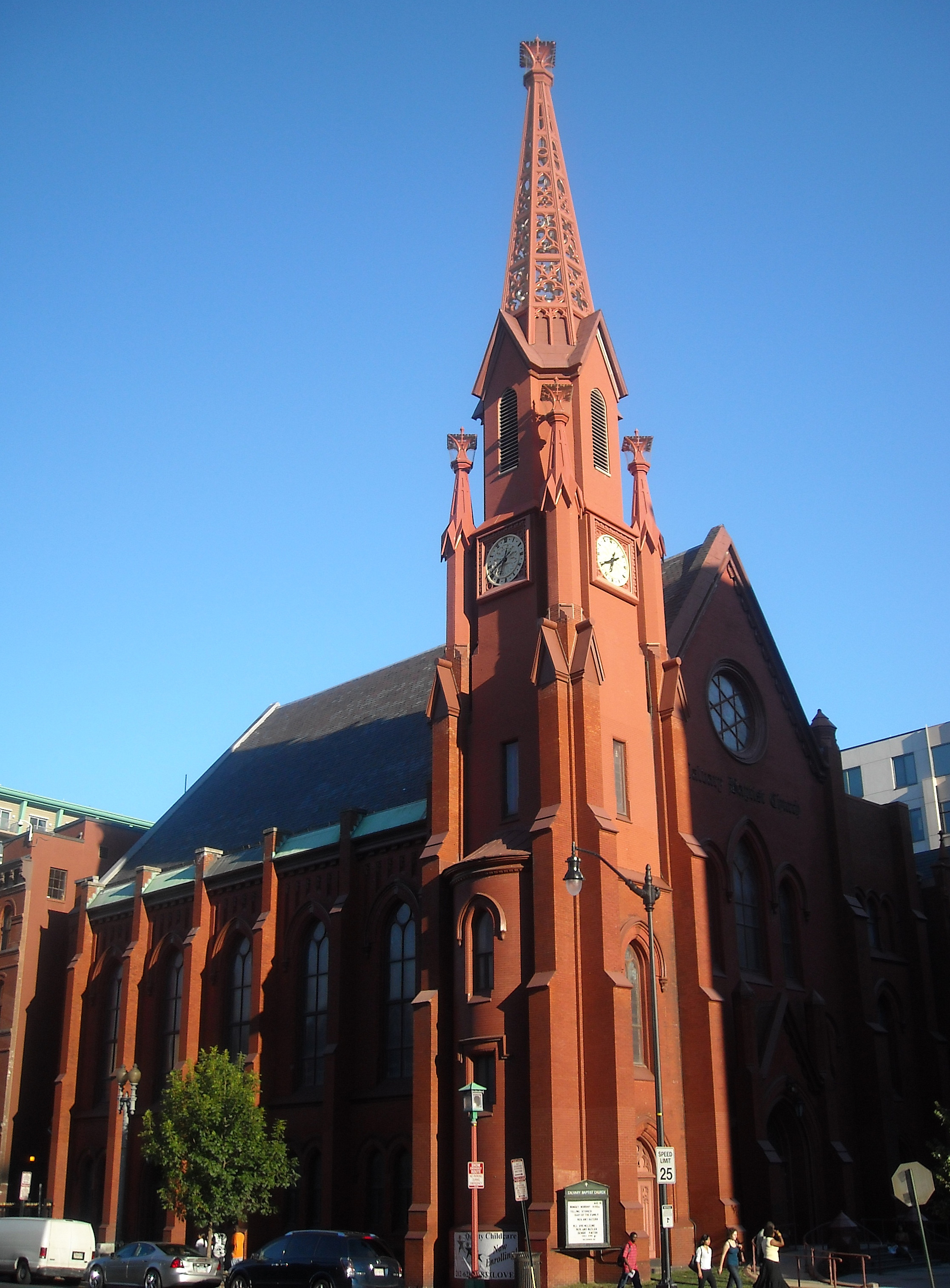
Calvary Baptist Church in 2008. Kendall financed its construction, and it was completed in 1866. It suffered a severe fire in 1868. This is the reconstructed building, finished in 1869.

=== Financial difficulties ===
Back in private life, Kendall started two newspapers in Washington, D.C., but both ceased operations shortly after opening. Throughout the 1840s, Kendall was the subject of numerous lawsuits from postal contractors who sued him for damages over his manipulation of Post Office operations. While in office, Kendall lost one Supreme Court decision. He had refused to honor a contract for mail delivery signed by his predecessor, even though Congress had enacted legislation requiring him to do so. Kendall said the legislation was an unconstitutional infringement on the executive branch. In Kendall v. United States ex rel. Stokes, 37 U.S. 524 (1838), the Supreme Court disagreed. But in Kendall v. Stokes, 44 U.S. 87 (1845), the Supreme Court held that Kendall was not personally liable for the debt owed, saving him from incarceration in debtors' prison.

While the court cases were proceeding, Kendall's financial situation deteriorated. His two newspapers lost large sums of money. In addition, the value of the land he owned in Kentucky was greatly depressed. He purchased a 102-acre (410,000 m^{2}) farm in northeast Washington for $9,000 in 1841 to generate income, and named it Kendall Green. But it was not enough. In 1838, Kendall had rented a 10-room mansion named Jackson Hill located at the site of what is now the National Zoo. He was forced to give up Jackson Hill in October 1841 and move his family into an unfinished, 26-square-foot (2.4 m^{2}) home at Kendall Green.

Kendall reluctantly returned to the practice of law in 1843, representing individuals and groups that had financial claims against the U.S. government. Among these were the Western Cherokee. Kendall helped to prove the independence of the Western Cherokee from the Old Nation, which gave them control over their lands and a portion of a $5 million settlement.

=== Association with Samuel Morse ===
In March 1845, Samuel Morse and Alfred Vail hired Kendall as their business manager. Kendall agreed, and received a 10 percent commission on all patent licenses he was able to obtain. Two months later, Kendall incorporated the Magnetic Telegraph Company to own and operate a telegraph line between Washington, D.C., and New York City. It was the first privately owned telegraph line in the nation's history. Within seven years, Boston was linked with New York City; an extensive network of lines linked New York City with Albany and cities throughout Ohio and along the Mississippi River; and New Orleans was linked to Washington, D.C.

Patent commissions, the sale of Magnetic Telegraph to the American Telegraph Company in 1859, and other telegraph investments made Kendall a wealthy man again.

=== Founding Gallaudet University ===
In 1857, Kendall co-founded what would eventually become Gallaudet University for the deaf. Platt H. Skinner had brought 20 deaf children to Washington, D.C. to help raise money for a school for the deaf. Kendall served on the board of Skinner's school. When a local court removed 15 of the children from Skinner's custody for abuse, the five remaining children (all orphans from New York) were placed in Kendall's care. Kendall incorporated the Kendall School, and donated his home and 2 acres (8,100 m^{2}) of land at Kendall Green for the school's use. On February 16, 1857, at Kendall's urging, Congress passed legislation giving the Kendall School a charter as the Columbia Institution for the Education of the Deaf and Dumb and the Blind. Three months later, Kendall hired Edward Miner Gallaudet as the school's first superintendent, while Kendall assumed the presidency of the institution's board of directors.

Various forces persuaded Gallaudet that a children's school was not enough, and that a degree-granting college should be formed. The idea took years to develop, and Kendall was initially opposed, but Gallaudet persisted. On April 8, 1864, Congress passed legislation authorizing the transition of the Columbia Institution to the National Deaf-Mute College. The Kendall School, now named Kendall Demonstration Elementary School, remained a unit of the college. In 1865 Congress appropriated money for the purchase of 14 acres (57,000 m^{2}) of Kendall Green to form the grounds of the new college and permit construction of new instructional buildings.

=== Religious activities ===
In his later years, Kendall became increasingly pious and devoted himself to religious study. After a number of the members of the Third (E Street) Baptist Church were dismissed in May 1862 for being too theologically progressive, they founded Calvary (Sixth) Baptist Church on June 2, 1862. Although Kendall was not a member of the church, he had a high regard for its pastor and offered to donate $90,000 toward construction of a building. The congregation built a luxurious house of worship that cost $115,000. Kendall was welcomed as a member of Calvary Baptist Church on March 31, 1865.

The church opened its doors in June 1866, around the time Kendall was made a senior deacon in the congregation. But within 18 months the building was consumed by fire. As it was insured for only $50,000, Kendall donated another $15,000 to rebuild the edifice.

Kendall also provided for the purchase of land and construction of a chapel at 13-1/2 and D Streets Southwest. It was dedicated on November 21, 1869, nine days after Kendall's death. It was named Kendall Chapel. Over time, the membership of this branch of Calvary Baptist Church grew large enough to constitute a separate church. The branch was spun off as a distinct congregation in November 1891, and the building renamed Kendall Baptist Church.

== Death ==
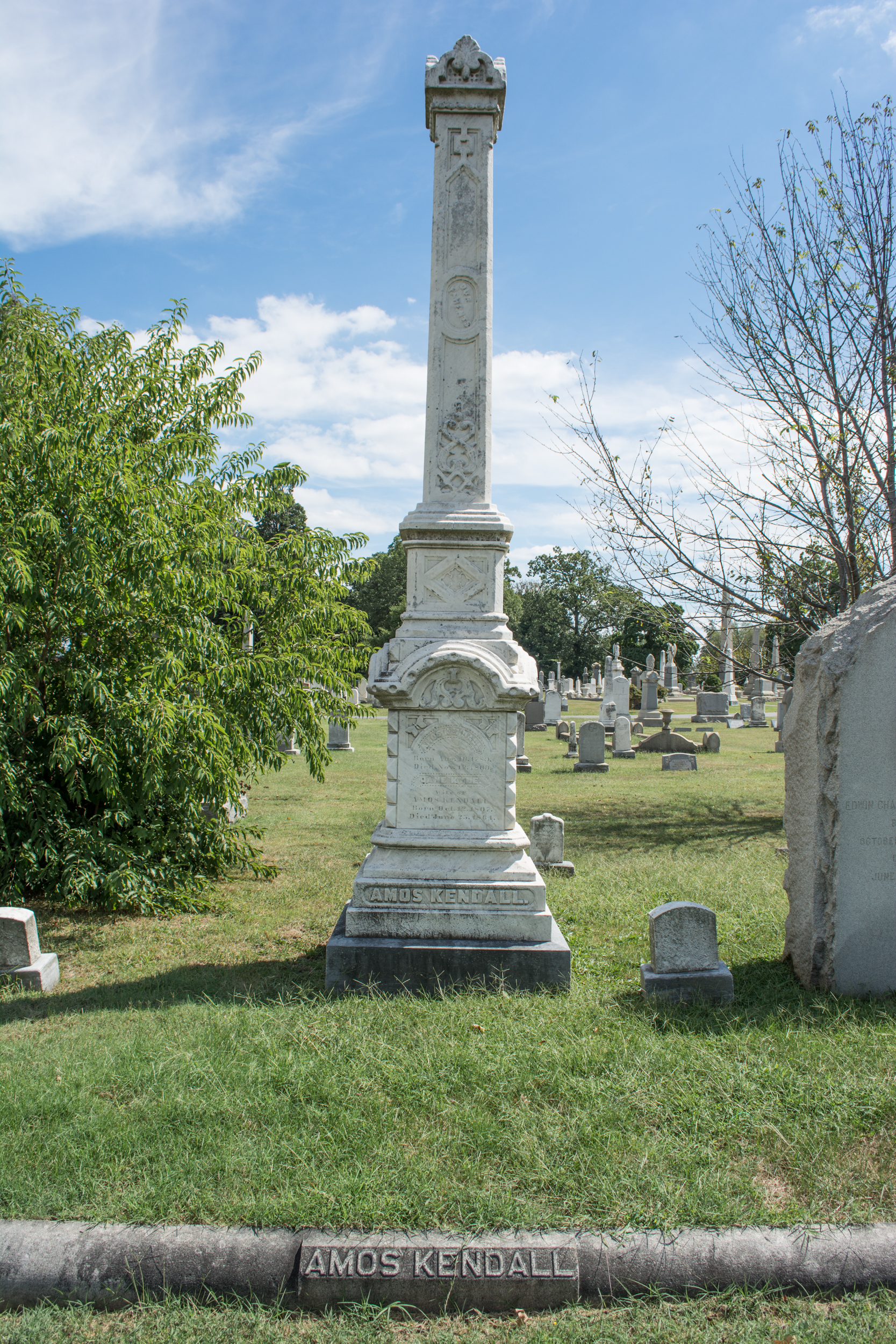
Grave of Amos Kendall at Glenwood Cemetery

Kendall fell ill with a digestive illness and insomnia in the summer of 1869. On August 2, he traveled to New York City to visit a nephew. He fell ill with what he believed was a common cold, but by the time he returned to Washington, D.C., on August 14, he was bedridden. As his wife was preparing to move the household into the William Stickney mansion at 6th and M Streets NW, Kendall resided at the home of his son-in-law Robert C. Fox.

Three weeks later, still bedridden, Kendall joined his family at the Stickney mansion. Kendall was unable to eat and was in great pain. He called his illness "bilious fever", but it was more likely cancer of the liver and the stomach. The pain was so great, Kendall considered suicide, and he remained bedridden until the end of his life.

Amos Kendall died at dawn at his home in the Stickney Mansion on Friday, November 12, 1869. He was interred in Glenwood Cemetery in Washington, D.C. He was the last surviving cabinet member of Jackson's and Van Buren's presidencies.

Kendall's will provided for the purchase of land and construction of a chapel of a second branch chapel for Calvary Baptist Church as well. This became known as Mission Chapel (later known as Memorial Chapel). His will also created a scholarship at what is now George Washington University. The scholarship was awarded to the student from the District of Columbia who scored the highest ranking on the college's entrance exam. The scholarship existed so long as a member of Calvary Baptist Church continued to sit on the university's board of trustees.

== Religious beliefs ==
During his sophomore year at Dartmouth, Kendall's belief in Congregationalist theology began to waver. During a trip to Vermont to see relatives in September 1809, he worshiped at a Christian Church and was amazed to see that their religious services not only involved women but were emotionally charged. While living in Groton in the fall of 1811, he rejected Roman Catholicism and Unitarianism but was strongly attracted to the revivalist preaching of Congregational minister Edward Dodge Griffin. While living in Lexington, he attended some Methodist churches, but found them too loud and bombastic.

Kendall later said that he converted to the Baptist faith shortly after establishing himself in Kentucky, although he did not formally join a Baptist congregation until 1865.

== Legacy ==
Kendall County, Illinois, and Kendall, New York, are named in Kendall's honor. He is the namesake of Kendallville, Indiana.

== Bibliography ==
- Adams, John Quincy. Memoirs of John Quincy Adams, Comprising Portions of His Diary from 1795 to 1848. Vol. 10. Charles Francis Adams, ed. New York: AMS Press, 1970. (Originally published 1874–1877.)
- Bedi, Joyce E. "Morse, Samuel Finley Breese, 1791-1872." In The Froehlich/Kent Encyclopedia of Telecommunications. Fritz E. Froehlich and Allen Kent, eds. New York: CRC Press, 1992.
- Cathcart, William. The Baptist Encyclopaedia. Philadelphia: Everts, 1880.
- Cole, Donald B. A Jackson Man: Amos Kendall and the Rise of American Democracy. Baton Rouge, La.: Louisiana State University Press, 2004.
- Cutlip, Scott M. (1995) Public Relations History: From the 17th to the 20th Century. Hillsdale, N.J.: Erlbaum, ISBN 0-8058-1465-5.
- William T. Davis (1895) Bench and Bar of the Commonwealth of Massachusetts. Boston: The Boston History Company.
- Dodge, Andrew R. Biographical Directory of the United States Congress: 1774-2005. Washington, D.C.: U.S. Government Printing Office, 2005.
- Gilman, Stuart C. (January 1995). "Presidential Ethics and the Ethics of the Presidency". The Annals of the American Academy of Political and Social Science. 537: 58–75. doi:10.1177/0002716295537000006. JSTOR 1047754. S2CID 143876977.
- Green, Samuel A. Groton Historical Series. A Collection of Papers Relating to the History of the Town of Groton, Massachusetts. Vol. 3. Groton, Mass.: University Press/John Wilson and Son, 1893.
- Hall, Kermit L. and Ely, Jr., James W. The Oxford Companion to the Supreme Court of the United States. New York: Oxford University Press, 2011.
- Heidler, David Stephen and Heidler, Jeanne T. Henry Clay: The Essential American. New York: Random House, 2010.
- Hochfelder, David. The Telegraph in America, 1832-1920. Baltimore, Md.: Johns Hopkins University Press, 2012.
- Hoig, Stan W. The Cherokees and Their Chiefs: In the Wake of Empire. Fayetteville, Ark.: University of Arkansas Press, 1998.
- Howe, Daniel Walker. What Hath God Wrought: The Transformation of America, 1815-1848. New York: Oxford University Press, 2007.
- Gallaudet, Edward Miner. "History of the College for the Deaf, 1857-1907." Washington: Gallaudet University Press, 1983.
- Amos Kendall (1872) (edited by William Stickney) Autobiography of Amos Kendall Boston: Lee and Shepard, via Internet Archive
- Kleber, John E., ed. The Kentucky Encyclopedia. Lexington, Ky.: University Press of Kentucky, 1992.
- MacDonald, William. Jacksonian Democracy, 1829-1837. New York: Harper and Bros., 1906.
- Manning, Martin J. "Kendall, Amos." In Encyclopedia of Media and Propaganda in Wartime America. Martin J. Manning and Clarence R. Wyatt, eds. Santa Barbara, Calif.: ABC-CLIO, 2010.
- O'Brien, Steven; McGuire, Paula; McPherson, James M.; and Gerstle, Gary. American Political Leaders: From Colonial Times to the Present. Santa Barbara, Calif.: ABC-CLIO, 1991.
- Ratner, Lorman A. and Teeter, Dwight L. Fanatics and Fire-Eaters: Newspapers and the Coming of the Civil War. Urbana, Ill.: University of Illinois Press, 2003.
- Remini, Robert V. (1984). Andrew Jackson and the Course of American Democracy, 1833–1845. New York: Harper & Row Publishers, Inc. ISBN 978-0-06-015279-6.
- Remini, Robert Vincent. Henry Clay: Statesman for the Union. New York: W.W. Norton, 1991.
- Remini, Robert Vincent. Martin Van Buren and the Making of the Democratic Party. New York: Columbia University Press, 1961.
- Sloan, W. David. and Startt, James D. The Media in America: A History. Northport, Ala: Vision Press, 1996.
- Stickney, William, ed. "Death" and "Funeral". In Autobiography of Amos Kendall. By Amos Kendall. Boston: Lee and Shepard, 1872.
- Vaughn, Stephen L. "Kendall, Amos." In Encyclopedia of American Journalism. New York: CRC Press, 2007.
- Wilbur, William. Chronicles of Calvary Baptist Church in the City of Washington. Washington, D.C.: Judd & Detweiler, 1914.

Political offices
Preceded by William T. Barry	United States Postmaster General; Served under: Andrew Jackson, Martin Van Buren; 1835–1840	Succeeded by John M. Niles
