= Pacific Division (NHL) =

Division of the National Hockey League

- Formerly: Smythe Division
- Conference: Western Conference
- League: National Hockey League
- Sport: Ice hockey
- Founded: 1993; Suspended in 2020–21; 2021 (reactivated)
- No. of teams: 8
- Most recent champion: Vegas Golden Knights (5th title) (2025–26)
- Most titles: Anaheim Ducks and San Jose Sharks (6 titles each)

Pacific Division teams location

The National Hockey League's Pacific Division was formed in 1993 as part of the Western Conference in a league realignment. It is also one of the two successors of the Smythe Division (the other one was the Northwest Division), though of the current teams, only the Anaheim Ducks, Seattle Kraken and Vegas Golden Knights did not play in the Smythe Division. Due to subsequent realignments, three of the Pacific Division's original teams (the Calgary Flames, Edmonton Oilers, and Vancouver Canucks) left the division in 1998 but returned in 2013. The division is the only one in the NHL without any Original Six teams. Due to the COVID-19 pandemic and the resulting closure of the Canada–United States border, all eight teams were transferred into two different divisions for the 2020–21 NHL season. The American-based teams were moved to the West Division, while the Canadian-based teams were placed into the North Division.

With the addition of the expansion Seattle Kraken to the division in the 2021–22 NHL season and the NHL becoming a 32 team league, the Coyotes were moved to the Central Division to balance out the divisional alignment of eight teams per division.

== Division lineups ==
=== 1993–1995 ===
1993–1995 Pacific Division teams
- Mighty Ducks of Anaheim
- Calgary Flames
- Edmonton Oilers
- Los Angeles Kings
- San Jose Sharks
- Vancouver Canucks

==== Changes from the 1992–93 season ====
- The Pacific Division is formed as a result of NHL realignment
- The Calgary Flames, Edmonton Oilers, Los Angeles Kings, San Jose Sharks, and Vancouver Canucks come from the Smythe Division
- The Mighty Ducks of Anaheim are added as an expansion team

=== 1995–1998 ===
1995–1998 Pacific Division teams
- Mighty Ducks of Anaheim
- Calgary Flames
- Colorado Avalanche
- Edmonton Oilers
- Los Angeles Kings
- San Jose Sharks
- Vancouver Canucks

==== Changes from the 1994–95 season ====
- The Quebec Nordiques relocate to Denver, Colorado, and become the Colorado Avalanche
- The Colorado Avalanche come from the Northeast Division

=== 1998–2006 ===
1998–2006 Pacific Division teams
- Mighty Ducks of Anaheim
- Dallas Stars
- Los Angeles Kings
- Phoenix Coyotes
- San Jose Sharks

==== Changes from the 1997–98 season ====
- The Calgary Flames, Colorado Avalanche, Edmonton Oilers, and Vancouver Canucks move to the Northwest Division
- The Dallas Stars and Phoenix Coyotes come from the Central Division

=== 2006–2013 ===
2006–2013 Pacific Division teams
- Anaheim Ducks
- Dallas Stars
- Los Angeles Kings
- Phoenix Coyotes
- San Jose Sharks

==== Changes from the 2005–06 season ====
- The Mighty Ducks of Anaheim changed their name to the Anaheim Ducks

=== 2013–2014 ===
2013–14 Pacific Division teams
- Anaheim Ducks
- Calgary Flames
- Edmonton Oilers
- Los Angeles Kings
- Phoenix Coyotes
- San Jose Sharks
- Vancouver Canucks

==== Changes from the 2012–13 season ====
- The Northwest Division is dissolved due to NHL realignment
- The Dallas Stars move to the Central Division
- The Calgary Flames, Edmonton Oilers, and Vancouver Canucks come from the Northwest Division

=== 2014–2017 ===
2014–2017 Pacific Division teams
- Anaheim Ducks
- Arizona Coyotes
- Calgary Flames
- Edmonton Oilers
- Los Angeles Kings
- San Jose Sharks
- Vancouver Canucks

==== Changes from the 2013–14 season ====
- The Phoenix Coyotes changed their name to the Arizona Coyotes

=== 2017–2020 ===
2017–2020 Pacific Division teams
- Anaheim Ducks
- Arizona Coyotes
- Calgary Flames
- Edmonton Oilers
- Los Angeles Kings
- San Jose Sharks
- Vancouver Canucks
- Vegas Golden Knights

==== Changes from the 2016–17 season ====
- The Vegas Golden Knights are added as an expansion team

=== 2020–2021 ===
- Division not used for the 2020–21 NHL season

==== Changes from the 2019–20 season ====
- Due to COVID-19 restrictions the NHL realigned into four divisions with no conferences for the 2020–21 season
- The Anaheim Ducks, Arizona Coyotes, Los Angeles Kings, San Jose Sharks and Vegas Golden Knights move to the West Division
- The Calgary Flames, Edmonton Oilers and Vancouver Canucks move to the North Division

=== 2021–present ===
2021–present Pacific Division teams
- Anaheim Ducks
- Calgary Flames
- Edmonton Oilers
- Los Angeles Kings
- San Jose Sharks
- Seattle Kraken
- Vancouver Canucks
- Vegas Golden Knights

==== Changes from the 2020–21 season ====
- The league returned to using a four division and two conference alignment
- The Anaheim Ducks, Los Angeles Kings, San Jose Sharks and Vegas Golden Knights come from the West Division
- The Calgary Flames, Edmonton Oilers and Vancouver Canucks come from the North Division
- The Seattle Kraken are added as an expansion team

== Season results ==
^{(#)}	Denotes team that won the Stanley Cup
^{(#)}	Denotes team that won the Clarence S. Campbell Bowl, but lost Stanley Cup Final
^{(#)}	Denotes team that qualified for the Stanley Cup playoffs
‡	Denotes winner of the Presidents' Trophy

Season	1st	2nd	3rd	4th	5th	6th	7th	8th
1993–94	^{(2)} Calgary (97)	^{(7)} Vancouver (85)	^{(8)} San Jose (82)	Anaheim (71)	Los Angeles (66)	Edmonton (64)		
1994–95^{[a]}	^{(2)} Calgary (55)	^{(6)} Vancouver (48)	^{(7)} San Jose (42)	Los Angeles (41)	Edmonton (38)	Anaheim (37)		
1995–96	^{(2)} Colorado (104)	^{(6)} Calgary (79)	^{(7)} Vancouver (79)	Anaheim (78)	Edmonton (68)	Los Angeles (66)	San Jose (47)	
1996–97	^{(1)} Colorado (107)^{‡}	^{(4)} Anaheim (85)	^{(7)} Edmonton (81)	Vancouver (77)	Calgary (73)	Los Angeles (67)	San Jose (62)	
1997–98	^{(2)} Colorado (95)	^{(5)} Los Angeles (87)	^{(7)} Edmonton (80)	^{(8)} San Jose (78)	Calgary (67)	Anaheim (65)	Vancouver (64)	
1998–99	^{(1)} Dallas (114)^{‡}	^{(4)} Phoenix (90)	^{(6)} Anaheim (83)	^{(7)} San Jose (80)	Los Angeles (69)			
1999–2000	^{(2)} Dallas (102)	^{(5)} Los Angeles (94)	^{(6)} Phoenix (90)	^{(8)} San Jose (87)	Anaheim (83)			
2000–01	^{(3)} Dallas (106)	^{(5)} San Jose (95)	^{(7)} Los Angeles (92)	Phoenix (90)	Anaheim (66)			
2001–02	^{(3)} San Jose (99)	^{(6)} Phoenix (95)	^{(7)} Los Angeles (95)	Dallas (90)	Anaheim (69)			
2002–03	^{(1)} Dallas (111)	^{(7)} Anaheim (95)	Los Angeles (78)	Phoenix (78)	San Jose (73)			
2003–04	^{(2)} San Jose (104)	^{(5)} Dallas (97)	Los Angeles (81)	Anaheim (76)	Phoenix (68)			
2004–05	No season due to the 2004–05 NHL lockout							
2005–06	^{(2)} Dallas (112)	^{(5)} San Jose (99)	^{(6)} Anaheim (98)	Los Angeles (89)	Phoenix (81)			
2006–07	^{(2)} Anaheim (110)	^{(5)} San Jose (107)	^{(6)} Dallas (107)	Los Angeles (68)	Phoenix (67)			
2007–08	^{(2)} San Jose (108)	^{(4)} Anaheim (102)	^{(5)} Dallas (97)	Phoenix (83)	Los Angeles (71)			
2008–09	^{(1)} San Jose (117)^{‡}	^{(8)} Anaheim (91)	Dallas (83)	Phoenix (79)	Los Angeles (79)			
2009–10	^{(1)} San Jose (113)	^{(4)} Phoenix (107)	^{(6)} Los Angeles (101)	Anaheim (89)	Dallas (88)			
2010–11	^{(2)} San Jose (105)	^{(4)} Anaheim (99)	^{(6)} Phoenix (99)	^{(7)} Los Angeles (98)	Dallas (95)			
2011–12	^{(3)} Phoenix (97)	^{(7)} San Jose (96)	^{(8)} Los Angeles (95)	Dallas (89)	Anaheim (80)			
2012–13^{[b]}	^{(2)} Anaheim (66)	^{(5)} Los Angeles (59)	^{(6)} San Jose (57)	Phoenix (51)	Dallas (48)			
2013–14	^{(1)} Anaheim (116)	^{(2)} San Jose (111)	^{(3)} Los Angeles (100)	Phoenix (89)	Vancouver (83)	Calgary (77)	Edmonton (67)	
2014–15	^{(1)} Anaheim (109)	^{(2)} Vancouver (101)	^{(3)} Calgary (97)	Los Angeles (95)	San Jose (89)	Edmonton (62)	Arizona (56)	
2015–16	^{(1)} Anaheim (103)	^{(2)} Los Angeles (102)	^{(3)} San Jose (98)	Arizona (78)	Calgary (77)	Vancouver (75)	Edmonton (70)	
2016–17	^{(1)} Anaheim (105)	^{(2)} Edmonton (103)	^{(3)} San Jose (99)	^{(WC1)} Calgary (94)	Los Angeles (86)	Arizona (70)	Vancouver (69)	
2017–18	^{(1)} Vegas (109)	^{(2)} Anaheim (101)	^{(3)} San Jose (100)	^{(WC1)} Los Angeles (98)	Calgary (84)	Edmonton (78)	Vancouver (73)	Arizona (70)
2018–19	^{(1)} Calgary (107)	^{(2)} San Jose (101)	^{(3)} Vegas (93)	Arizona (86)	Vancouver (81)	Anaheim (80)	Edmonton (79)	Los Angeles (71)
2019–20^{[c]}	^{(3)} Vegas (71 gp 86 pts..606 ppct.)	^{(5)} Edmonton (71 gp 83 pts..585 ppct.)	^{(7)} Vancouver (69 gp 78 pts..565 ppct.)	^{(8)} Calgary (70 gp 79 pts..564 ppct.)	^{(11)} Arizona (70 gp 74 pts..529 ppct.)	Anaheim (71 gp 67 pts..472 ppct.)	Los Angeles (70 gp 64 pts..457 ppct.)	San Jose (70 gp 63 pts..450 ppct.)
2020–21	Division suspended for the season; temporary realignment							
2021–22	^{(1)} Calgary (111)	^{(2)} Edmonton (104)	^{(3)} Los Angeles (99)	Vegas (94)	Vancouver (92)	San Jose (77)	Anaheim (76)	Seattle (60)
2022–23	^{(1)} Vegas (111)	^{(2)} Edmonton (109)	^{(3)} Los Angeles (104)	^{(WC1)} Seattle (100)	Calgary (93)	Vancouver (83)	San Jose (60)	Anaheim (58)
2023–24	^{(1)} Vancouver (109)	^{(2)} Edmonton (104)	^{(3)} Los Angeles (99)	^{(WC2)} Vegas (98)	Calgary (81)	Seattle (81)	Anaheim (59)	San Jose (47)
2024–25	^{(1)} Vegas (110)	^{(2)} Los Angeles (105)	^{(3)} Edmonton (101)	Calgary (96)	Vancouver (90)	Anaheim (80)	Seattle (76)	San Jose (52)
2025–26	^{(1)} Vegas (95)	^{(2)} Edmonton (93)	^{(3)} Anaheim (92)	^{(WC2)} Los Angeles (90)	San Jose (86)	Seattle (79)	Calgary (77)	Vancouver (58)

Notes

- ^{a} The 1994–95 NHL season was shortened to 48 games due to the lockout.
- ^{b} The 2012–13 NHL season was shortened to 48 games due to the lockout.
- ^{c} The 2019–20 NHL season was cut short due to the COVID-19 pandemic. Due to the imbalance in the number of games played among teams, the regular season standings were determined by points percentage.

== Pacific Division titles won by team ==
Teams in bold are currently in the division.

Team	Wins	Last win
**Anaheim Ducks**	6	2017
**San Jose Sharks**	6	2011
Dallas Stars	5	2006
**Vegas Golden Knights**	5	2026
**Calgary Flames**	4	2022
Colorado Avalanche	3	1998
Arizona Coyotes	1	2012
**Vancouver Canucks**	1	2024
**Edmonton Oilers**	0	—
**Los Angeles Kings**	0	—
**Seattle Kraken**	0	—
