= Effective Public Relations =

1952 book about public relations

Effective Public Relations: Pathways to Public Favor
- Title page for Effective Public Relations (1964, 3rd edition)
- Author: Scott M. Cutlip
- Publisher: Prentice-Hall
- Publication date: 1952

Effective Public Relations is a book published in 1952 by University of Wisconsin professor Scott M. Cutlip and Allen H. Center. It was the first textbook in the field of public relations and introduced the "Seven Cs of communication".

== "Seven Cs of Communication" ==
The "7 C's of Communication" is a much-quoted list, first provided by Cutlip and Center in 1952 in Effective Public Relations. The original list was a follows:

- Completeness
- Conciseness
- Consideration
- Concreteness
- Courtesy
- Clearness
- Correctness

Various versions of this list, often modified and unattributed, are listed in many business, communications, marketing and public relations books and courses.

1. Credibility: Communication begins in a climate of belief. This climate is built by the performance of the sender who should reflect an earnest desire to serve the receiver. The receiver will then have high regard for the competency of the sender.
2. Context: An advertising/communications program must square with the realities of its environment. Your daily business activities must confirm, not contradict, the message.
3. Content: The message must have meaning and relevance for the receiver. Content determines the audience and vice versa.
4. Clarity: The message must be put in simple terms. Words used must have exactly the same meaning to the sender as they do to the receiver. Before communicating, organize your thoughts coherently. Construct a logical flow, ensuring that each point naturally leads to the next. Complex messages must be distilled into simpler terms, and the farther a message must travel, the simpler it should be.
5. Continuity and Consistency: Communication is an unending process. It requires repetition to achieve understanding. Repetition, with variation, contributes to learning both facts and attitudes.
6. Channels: Use established channels of communication—channels the receiver uses and respects. Creating new channels is difficult.
7. Capability of audience: Communication must take into account the capability of the audience. Communications are most effective when they require the least effort on the part of the recipient.

== Reception ==
The book was reviewed by J.M. Rathmell in The Journal of Marketing in January 1953. In 1990, the Washington Post said, "if there is such a thing as the 10 commandments of business then the second was laid down by Scott M Cutlip and Allen H Center in Effective Public Relations".
