= David Lax =

American academic

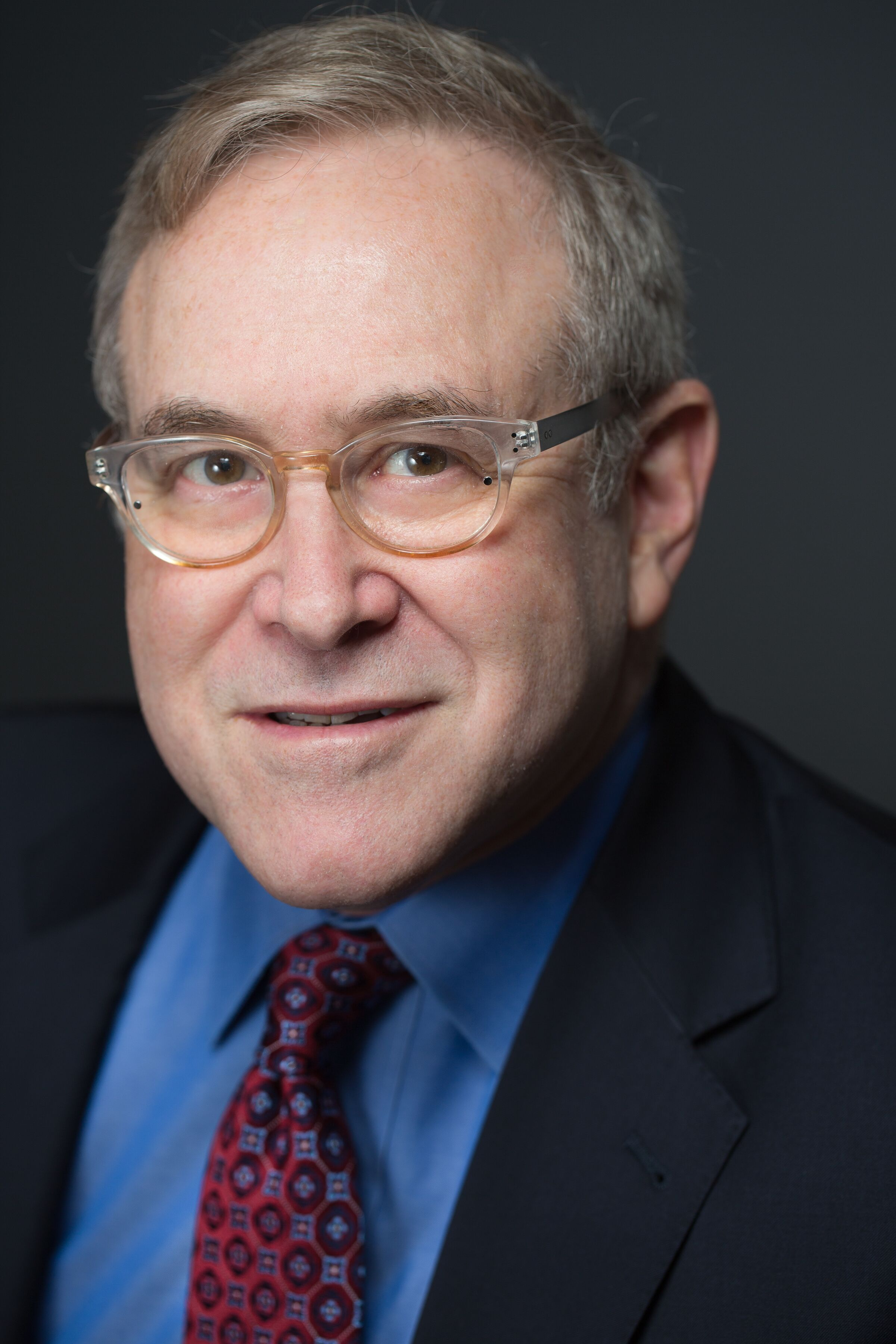
- Lax in 2017
- Education: BA, Princeton University; PhD, Harvard University
- Occupations: Consultant, author, entrepreneur, lecturer
- Website: negotiate.com

David Lax is an American negotiation expert, author, speaker, statistician and academic. He is currently a Distinguished Fellow at the Harvard Negotiation Project, Managing Principal of Lax Sebenius LLC, a firm that advises companies and governments in challenging and complex negotiations, and a former professor at Harvard Business School.

Lax began his career as a professor at Harvard Business School where he co-founded and directed the Harvard Negotiation Roundtable. After working on Wall Street, he co-founded Lax Sebenius LLC. He has taught and continues to teach in executive programs on negotiations at Harvard Law School and Harvard Business School. He is co-author with Professor James K. Sebenius of Harvard Business School of 3D Negotiation (2006) and The Manager as Negotiator (1986).

The 3D Negotiation approach draws on both academic research in decision analysis, game theory and cognitive and social psychology but also on years of experience advising in complex negotiations and studying great negotiators. Prior research and prescriptive advice on negotiation imagined that the parties, their interests and their Best Alternatives to Negotiated Agreement (BATNAs) were fixed and looked at how to predict outcomes or give advice to negotiators in that situation. Lax and Sebenius observed that negotiators frequently have much greater leverage on the outcome of negotiations by setting up the situation so that face-to-face negotiations have a much higher probability of producing a favorable outcome than they have from better at-the-table tactics.

Most recently, Lax and Sebenius have focused on the role of social media in shaping negotiations, particularly those in the public eye. In 2021, they co-authored a paper with Ben Cook and Paul Levy presenting a framework for understanding what they call "The Unexplored Power of Social Media in Negotiation," which they later expanded on in a Harvard Business Review article that suggested a "Playbook for Negotiators in the Social Media Era."

== Early life ==
Lax was born in Syracuse, NY and grew up in New Jersey. While attending Summit High School, he began working as a programmer for the statistics department at Bell Labs in Murray Hill, NJ and was a participant in a National Science Foundation Summer Program on Quantitative Social Science at Michigan State University.

== Education ==
Lax graduated from Princeton University in 1975 with a B.A. in statistics, magna cum laude. His senior thesis under advisor John Tukey at Princeton is considered a fundamental work on robust estimation of scale. He began graduate school in Statistics at Stanford University and completed his graduate work under Donald Rubin and Frederick Mosteller in Statistics at Harvard University, where he was a RIAS fellow, and received an M.S. in 1978 and a Ph.D. in statistics in 1981.

== Career ==
Lax was a Post-Doctoral Fellow under Professor Howard Raiffa, and then served as an assistant professor at Harvard Business School from 1981 to 1987, where he conducted research on negotiation with James K. Sebenius, with whom he had begun research as a graduate student. As a professor, he published a number of articles on negotiation. He taught the first course at Harvard Business School solely devoted to negotiation. With their mentor Professor Raiffa, he and Sebenius co-founded the Harvard Negotiation Roundtable, which became a project of the Harvard Program on Negotiation and brought together negotiation scholars and others to analyze cases of public and private sector negotiation to identify commonalities.

This effort fed into the publication in 1986 of The Manager as Negotiator, which drew on extensive case analysis as well as decision analysis, game theory and psychology: 1) to argue that a fundamental, cross-cutting function of managers was to get the cooperation of people, including subordinates, peers, and superiors as well as those outside of the manager's organization, who had no obligation to cooperate; and 2) to offer an intellectually sound and practically useful approach to preparing for and conducting negotiations.

Lax took a leave of absence from his teaching position at Harvard Business School to join a small investment bank that focused on restructuring in highly unionized industries and then joined First City Capital Corporation, the New York merchant banking arm of a wealthy Canadian family, where he analyzed and negotiated various private equity investments, joint venture entries and exits, financings, and structuring of partnership agreements. Upon leaving First City Capital and an affiliate, Lax began advising companies and governments in complex or challenging negotiations.

In 1996 he formed Lax Sebenius LLC with Professor James K. Sebenius. Lax Sebenius LLC advises companies and governments in complex or challenging negotiations, and also works to build the capability of companies to get better results in particular kinds of negotiations. Its corporate clients include American Express, Bupa, Diageo, Grupo Pao Azucar, Infineon, Intel, KPMG, Lufthansa, Novartis, Novo Nordisk, Raytheon, Royal Dutch Shell, Standard Chartered Bank, Telstra, TransAlta, and Verizon Wireless. The firm has worked on behalf of governments including Mexico, Indonesia, Malaysia and the United States and for a number of state-owned entities. Engagements that are in the public domain include:

- Negotiating with his colleague William Ury on behalf of a Brazilian billionaire to complete the sale of his company Grupo Pao Azucar to a French company Casino in a dispute/transaction that the Financial Times described "as one of the biggest cross-continental boardroom showdowns in history;"
- Advising Guinness on negotiating with Bernard Arnault of LVMH who was seeking to block the $30 billion merger of Guinness and Grand Metropolitan to form Diageo – the combined market capitalization of Guinness and Grand Met increased by 10% upon a deal with LVMH.

== Writing ==
Lax has published papers laying out the basic argument of 3D Negotiation, introducing the concept of Negotiation Campaigns, addressing the problem of how to negotiate in the context of long-term relationships such as minority equity investments, joint ventures or customer-supplier relationships with high switching costs, how much information to provide a negotiating agent, how to deal with the problem of contracts that are insecure because one party's best alternative to ongoing negotiation shifts predictably over time, leaving it vulnerable to forced contractual renegotiation, and ethics in negotiation.

But Lax's primary contributions to the negotiation literature come from his two books with Professor Sebenius. The Manager as Negotiator made a number of contributions to the field of negotiation. Lax and Sebenius observed that negotiation involves both cooperation to make both parties better off (what they called “creating value”) and act competitively to maximize value for themselves (what they called “claiming value”). Most academic and practical work to date had focused on either creating value or claiming value but Lax and Sebenius observed that creating value and claiming value are inextricably linked activities. Creating value requires learning enough about each side's interest to identify trades of elements that are low cost but high value to one party in exchange for elements that are low cost and high value to the other party. But, sharing information about what provides high value makes a negotiator vulnerable to value-claiming tactics to exploit that knowledge – the value-claimer may hold high value items hostage to extract value on other elements.

Lax and Sebenius then observed that negotiators face a dilemma in choosing between a value-creating approach (sharing information and acting to solve the joint problem) and a value claiming approach (keeping sensitive information under wraps, seeking to exploit information the other party reveals, "start high, concede slowly, exaggerate the value of concessions, minimize the benefits of the other's concessions, conceal information, argue forcefully on behalf of principles that imply favorable settlements, make commitments to accept only highly favorable agreements, and be willing to outwait the other fellow."[p. 50]). They called this the Negotiator's Dilemma. If in a two-party negotiation, one negotiator knew the other party was going to be a value-claimer, she would need to take a value-claiming stance to protect against exploitation. If on the other hand, she knew that the other party was going to take a value-creating approach, she could maximize her outcomes by claiming value and exploiting the information the counterpart revealed. Regardless of the approach chosen by the other player, she should take a value-claiming stance. Because this logic applies to both negotiators, the other negotiator should also take a value-claiming stance. Yet, if both do, they leave significant value unrealized – they end up dividing a small pie rather than a larger pie that could have been available to them. The Manager as Negotiator then offered a varied of methods for managing the Negotiator's Dilemma. Because much of the research and practical advice focused primarily on either creating value or claiming it, The Manager as Negotiator represented an increase in sophistication in both conceptual approach and practical advice. It also became “one of the leading textbooks on negotiation” and is the sixth most cited book on negotiation.

3D Negotiation increased the sophistication of negotiation analysis and prescription by addressing a key omission in virtually all academic writing on negotiation and most prescriptive advice on negotiation. While gathering experience as a negotiator and advisor in high-stakes negotiations, Lax and Sebenius amplified their observations that treating the parties, issues and BATNAs as fixed missed key dynamics of many negotiations and developed the descriptive and prescriptive analysis in a paper and then a book both entitled 3D Negotiation. The book defines the setup of a negotiation as including the parties (both current and potential, internal as well as external), each party's interests, and each party's BATNA as well as the sequencing of the process and general orchestration of the process. Both the article and the book illustrate that the most effective negotiators can and do work to change the setup of a negotiation to increase the probability of getting a favorable outcome and may try to change the setup mid-negotiation if it is unfavorable. While outstanding negotiators follow this approach intuitively, 3D Negotiation offers a prescriptive framework for preparing for and carrying out negotiation that enables negotiators to emulate the approach taken by the most effective negotiators.

== Contributions ==
David Lax published an early contribution to robust statistics, the first major Monte Carlo of robust estimation of scale, which was published in the Journal of the American Statistical Association.

With James K. Sebenius, he is the author of the books Manager as Negotiator: Bargaining for Cooperation and Competitive Gain (The Free Press, 1986) and 3-D Negotiation: Powerful Tools to Change the Game in Your Most Important Deals (Harvard Business School Press, 2006).

David Lax has contributed to the public discourse on several prominent negotiations, such as the 1994-95 NHL lockout. His suggestion was that revenue should flow into a separate escrow account touched by neither players nor owners until the dispute was resolved. This suggestion was not adopted

== Pro Bono Activities ==
Lax played a key role in The Carter Center's effort to help the three parties (the King, the political parties and the Maoists) in the civil war in Nepal successfully achieve a resolution. He led a project funded by the Madison Initiative to help Republicans and Democrats negotiate deals across party lines in the national security area. According to an evaluation performed by the Center for Evaluation Innovation on behalf of the William & Flora Hewlett Foundation, at least thirteen separate bills passed as a result of this project. He served on the board of the Abraham Path and, as Distinguished Fellow of Harvard Negotiation Project, he is working with the Climate Parliament on a Green Grids Accelerator, which is aimed at accelerating the completion of Green Grids (inter-connectors between power grids that facilitate the transmission of renewable energy and frequently connect power grids in different countries or regions). The Harvard Negotiation Project's efforts involve identifying obstacles face by Green Grids developers, studying their successes and failures in surmounting these obstacles, and sharing that information to help developers learn from each other's successes and failures.

== Personal life ==
Lax has been married to Canadian/American painter Ilana Manolson since 1984. They have two children. Eric T. Lax is co-founder of Pando Pooling and also of Trext and Riva HQ, and lives in San Francisco. Lena Lax is a nurse practitioner who lives in San Francisco.
