= Stephen Edlich =

American painter

- Born: Stephen Philip Edlich; April 9, 1944; Manhattan
- Died: November 3, 1989 (aged 45); Manhattan
- Known for: Artist
- Spouse: Marsha Hochberg Edlich

Stephen Edlich (April 9, 1944 – November 3, 1989) was an American collagist, sculptor, and printmaker whose career was cut short by his early death. Critics described his style as minimalist, restrained, and austere. His collages were, as one wrote, "constructed and systematic" as opposed to "lyrical, descriptive, or allusionistic". Some of them made direct reference to the papier collé paintings of Braque, Picasso and other well known modernists.

Edlich received his art education at New York University. During his career he organized and directed an art service company, and at the end of it was exploring ways to use optical discs for storing reference data for art auction houses. He was given solo exhibitions in nonprofit and commercial galleries throughout his career. His works have been acquired by major museums.

== Early life and training ==
Edlich was born in Greenwich Village in 1944. As a child he came to know and admire the work of abstract expressionist painter Franz Kline who was a friend of his parents.

He attended McBurney, a private school run by the YMCA. He received his college education at New York University and graduated in 1967 with a major in fine art studies. During his undergraduate years, Edlich traveled twice to England where he met artists whose work he admired, including Barbara Hepworth and Patrick Heron. A gallery show of Ben Nicholson's work he attended was particularly useful in shaping his ideas about art. While in London he also met gallerist Victor Waddington who would later stage his first solo exhibition in a commercial gallery. Shortly after beginning his career in art, he enrolled in a Master of Arts program at The New School for Social Research.

== Career in art ==
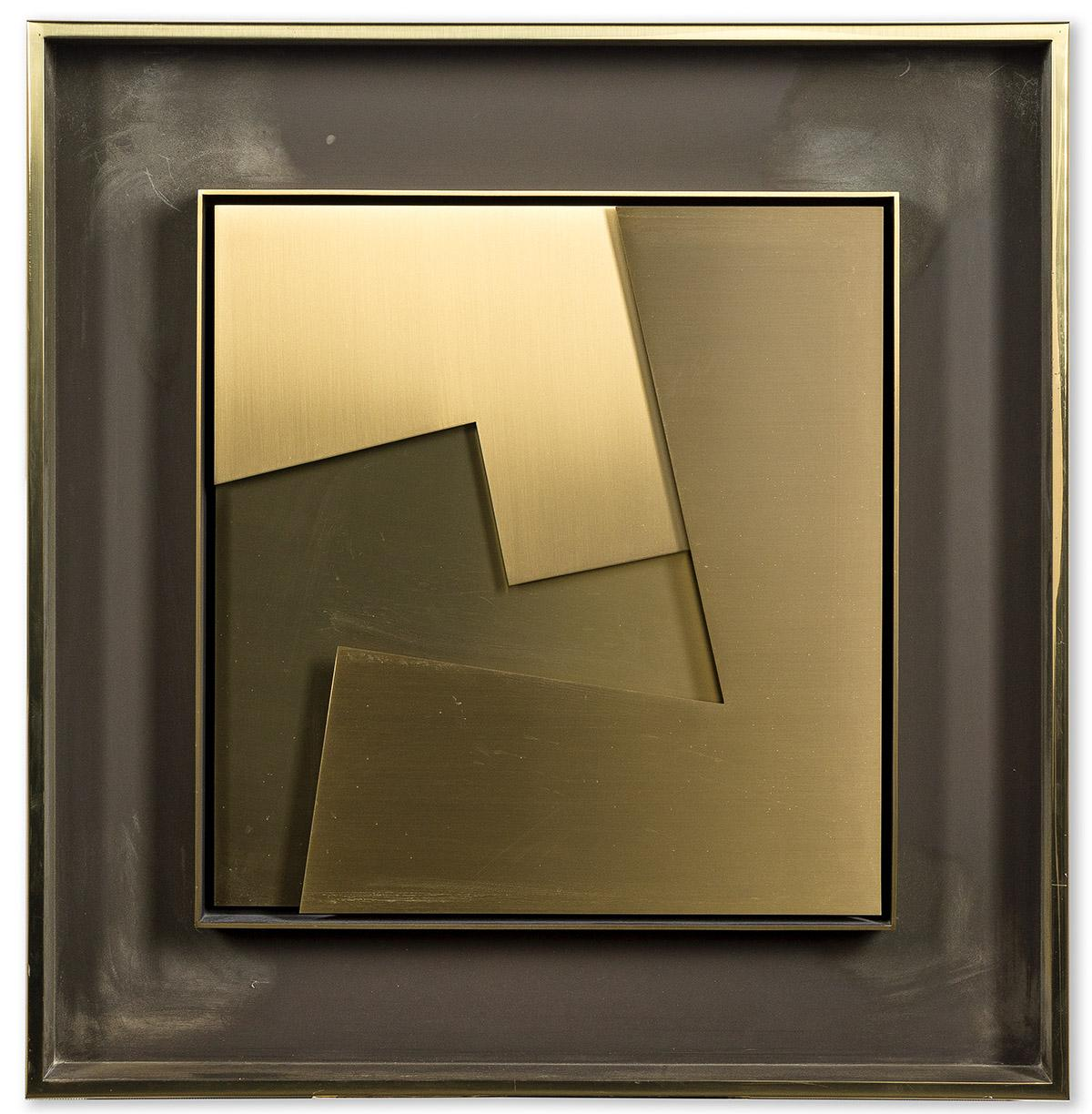
Stephen Edlich, 1969, untitled, three-layer bronze relief, 28 3/4 x 28 inches

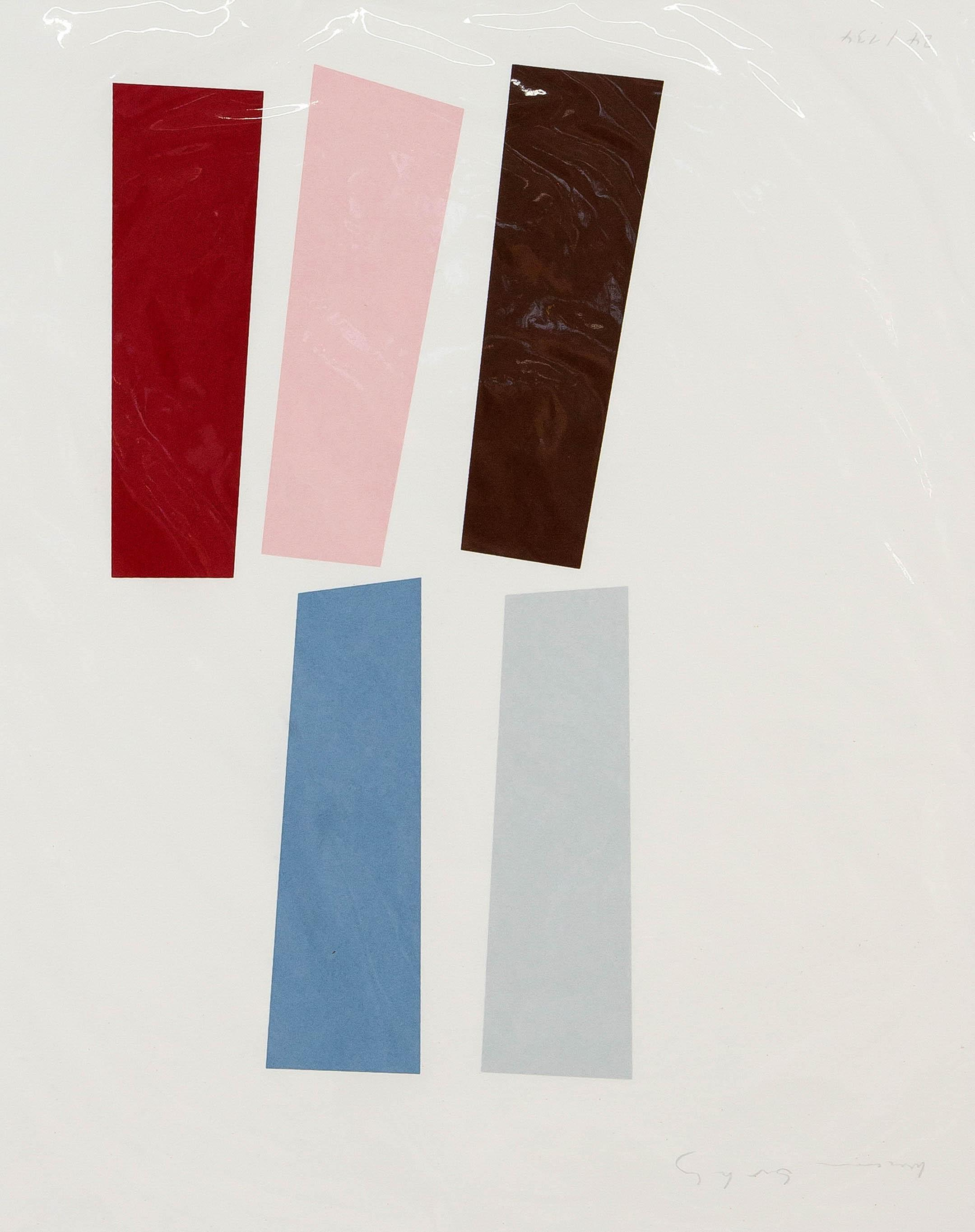
Stephen Edlich, 1969, untitled, serigraph, 23 1/2 x 18 1/2 inches

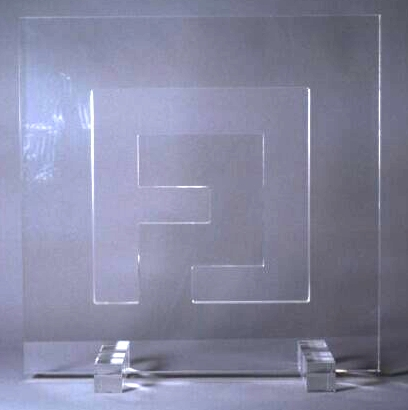
Stephen Edlich, about 1973, untitled, lucite sculpture, 17 1/2 x 21 inches

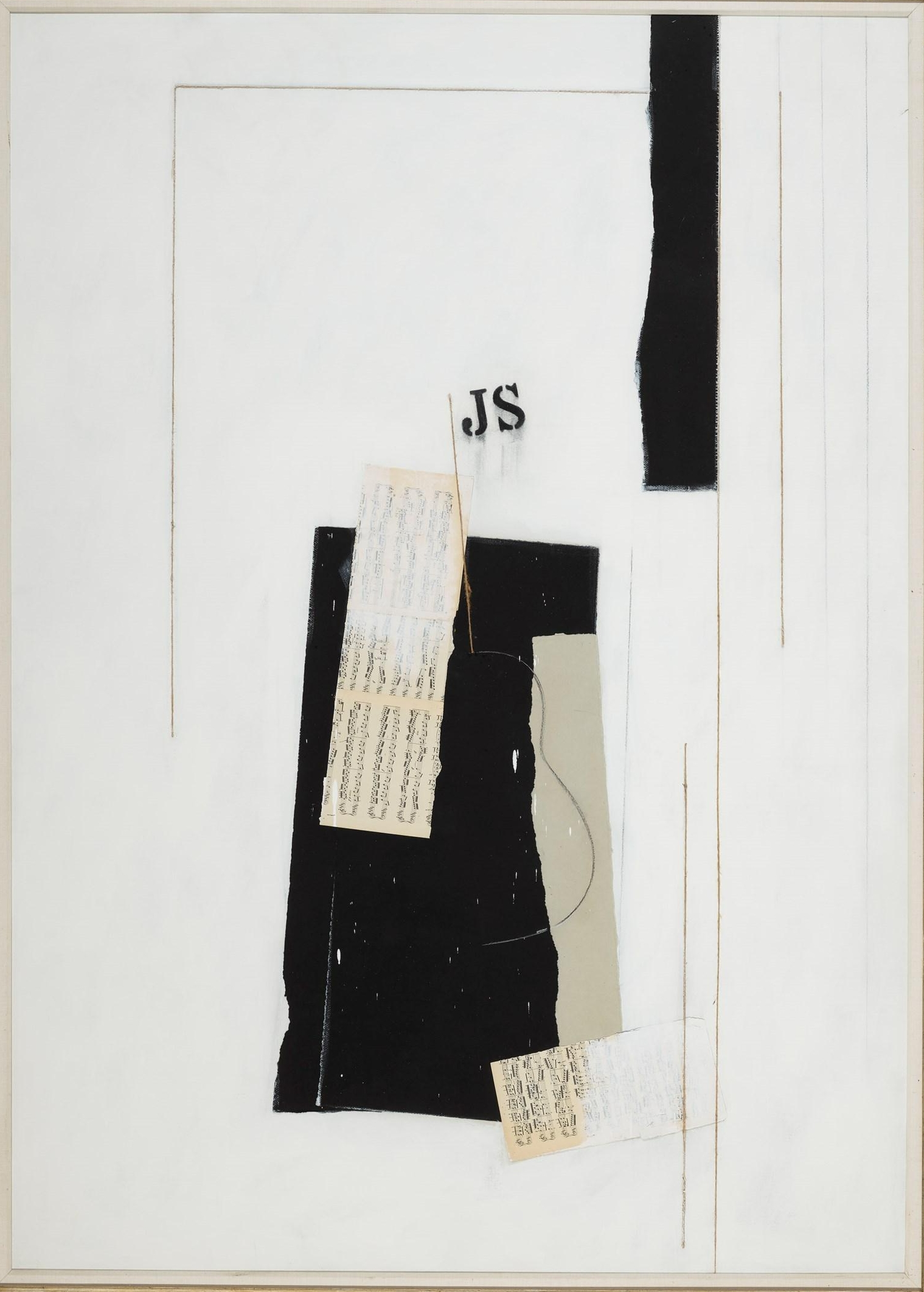
Stephen Edlich, 1977, untitled, "JS", acrylic polymer, jute, paper, and charcoal on canvas, 68 × 84 inches

Stephen Edlich, 1981 Reflections on a Season's Landscape, color etching, chine collé, 30 x 21 inches

Stephen Edlich, 1982, Overture with Cypress Forms, mixed media, acrylic paint and burlap on canvas, 60 x 40 inches

While still an undergraduate, Edlich began working for the Columbian Art Metal Works in Guttenberg, New Jersey, a small shop specializing in ecclesiastical decoration. Shortly after graduating, he showed prints in a solo exhibition at the flagship Bonwit Teller store on Fifth Avenue in Manhattan. Later he participated in group shows at local commercial galleries including the Byron, Albert Landry, and Richard Felgen Graphics galleries as well as the J.L. Hudson Gallery in Detroit. Early the next year the Contemporary Arts Gallery at NYU gave him a solo exhibition that included 15 reliefs and free-standing sculptures in Plexiglas and bronze. Edlich's career advanced when, after this show moved to a commercial gallery in Montreal, a critic for the Montreal Star gave it a favorable review. The following winter, the London Arts Gallery in Manhattan gave him a solo exhibition of what the New York Times called "minimalist sculpture". At this time Edlich was working at a screen printing shop in Manhattan.

In the summer of 1970 Edlich started an art advisory service called Corporate Arts Consultants which helped businesses that wanted to sponsor exhibitions or acquire paintings and sculpture. The following summer he showed with three other artists at the Mazelow Gallery in Toronto.

In 1974 Edlich showed recent sculpture in New York's oldest gallery devoted to American art. The show, at the Babcock Gallery, was his first solo in a New York commercial gallery. That year he also began a three-year stint as an adjunct lecturer in the fine arts department of the New York Institute of Technology.

The following year and the year after that, solo exhibitions in Manhattan's Gruenebaum Gallery elicited lengthy favorable reviews from critic John Russell in the New York Times. Between the two, a solo in a private gallery in Ann Arbor also drew extensive comments from a critic for a major daily paper. Addressing Russell's review of the 1975 show at Gruenebaum, that critic, writing in the Detroit Free Press, said, "Edlich is this month's wunderkind of the New York Art market, thanks to a most favorable review of a December New York gallery exhibition. Not that Edlich didn't deserve it—but the buyers are now lined up 50 in a row anxiously awaiting any Edlich painting in New York."

In 1976 and again in 1978–1979, Edlich appeared in a half-hour local-market television production called "The Art Show", first in suburban New York and later in Detroit. He traveled in Southern France during 1977 and 1978. Before his departure, he signed with Marlborough Gallery in Manhattan and after his return that gallery gave him the first of a series of solos that extended from 1979 to 1985.

In 1981 the Hokin Gallery in Miami and Palm Beach gave Edlich the first of many solo exhibitions. At about this time, major museums began collecting Edlich's artworks. The Brooklyn Museum acquired a mixed-media work called "Overture with Single Cypress Form" (1979–1981) in 1982. That year, the Cleveland Museum of Art acquired a large collage. The following year, the Metropolitan Museum of Art acquired a collage called "Passage, Opening with Cypress Forms III" (1980). Other museums that acquired Edlich's work include the Art Institute of Chicago, Philadelphia Museum of Art, Carnegie Museum of Art, Solomon R. Guggenheim Museum, and Museum of Fine Arts, Houston.

Between 1985 and his death in 1989, Edlich showed mainly at the Hokin Galleries. Of the last of these exhibitions, held in Miami in October 1988, a critic for Miami News wrote: "The Hokin Gallery has a serene exhibit of collages by classical modernist Stephen Edlich who draws on the Cubism of Picasso and Braque to create highly reductive statements of the highest degree of elegance. Using torn paper, wood veneers, and cloth, he makes eloquent compositions with minimal means."

At the end of his career, Edlich was exploring ways to use optical discs for storing reference data for art auction houses. After his death his son reported that Edlich had acted as an art dealer for his father and another collector and that he had assembled a notable collection of art books for his own library.

=== Artistic style ===
Edlich made works on paper and canvas as well as free-standing and relief sculptures. Early in his career he made serigraph prints and later made etchings, as, for example, "Reflections on a Season's Landscape" of 1981, shown here. He made cut-paper and mixed media collages on paper or canvas. He sculpted using Acrylite cast sheets and made framed reliefs using thin sheets of lacquered bronze.

Critics noted Edlich's adaptation of well-known works by other artists in his collages, particularly ones made by Braque and Picasso, and they pointed out that Edlich acknowledged these sources while creating works that were uniquely his own.

Critics also noted Edlich's minimalist approach to his sculptures. One said they derived their impact "from the simplicity and elegance of pure forms, the interplay of light on patterned surfaces and from spatial tensions created among intersecting planes.

By the middle of his short career Edlich became known for mixed media paintings on canvas in which he added burlap, sackcloth, and jute rope to acrylic painted surfaces. His "Overture with Cypress Forms" of 1982, shown here, is one such painting.

Writing in the New York Times, John Russell grouped Edlich with constructivist artists, meaning, as he said, that Edlich's art was "constructed and systematic" as opposed to "lyrical, descriptive, or allusionistic". He also said that Edlich's mixed-media paintings were "plain to the point of austerity. At the same time an anonymous critic for the Detroit Free Press suggested that in his paintings Edlich resolved an inherent tension between these two opposites. He said Edlich's "construction of the painting out of real (burlap, rope) and painted things (the shapes) sets up a conflict as the actual structure and painted structure appear to be one. Is it an object all on its own, or is it a picture of something? It's really both."

In addition to Braque and Picasso, critics saw in Edlich's work echoes of Mondrian, Nicholson, Motherwell, Matisse, and Chinese landscape painting. Late in his career, one critic referred to him as a "classical modernist" and his New York Times obituary said he was "admired for his deft recombination of elements from the classic era of European modernism".

Edlich used paper in his early collages and both golden-hued Muntz metal and white Everdur Silicon Bronze in his reliefs. An early reviewer noted that the reliefs had "straight-edge severity ameliorated by the color and sheen of the metals, changing according to the light."

While Edlich's early works had been roughly easel-sized, some of his mid-career mixed-media paintings were quite large. One of them, called "Passage, Opening with Cypress Forms III" of 1980 (acquired by the Metropolitan Museum of Art in 1983), was 78 inches high and 98 inches wide. Writing in 1983, Grace Glueck of the New York Times said, "The idea of collage as an intimate medium is forever dispelled by the giant scale in which Stephen Edlich works, although with the same finicky exactitude as collagists of smaller scope."

In 1985 John Russell attempted to summarize the evolution of Edlich's style and technique from his early work to that time. He said the early mixed-media paintings were derivative but achieved "cogency" and "seduction" by his use of strings and fabric, stenciled characters, and his skill in painting. Noting the increased size of his mixed-media paintings since then, he saw an "aesthetic of relaxation". A few years later, Russell again drew attention to Edlich's homage to predecessors. He wrote: "Mating painting with sculpture, and making volume keep company with hue, the work was an adroit anthology of idioms from the heroic age of modern art."

== Personal life and family ==
Edlich was born in Manhattan on April 9, 1944. His parents were Theodore Julius Edlich Jr., a prosperous physician, and Virginia Bargerhoff Edlich. Both parents were art collectors and close friends of artist Franz Kline. Edlich had two older brothers, Richard French Edlich and Theodore J. Edlich, 3rd. In 1971 Edlich married Marsha Hochberg, a high school French teacher. She was born in 1942 in Brooklyn and died in 2013 in East Hampton. Edlich and his wife had a son, Alexander Ryan Edlich.

When he died on November 3, 1989, at the age of 45, the cause of death was not determined.
