= McBurney School =

Boys college-preparatory school in Manhattan, New York, U.S.

Coordinates: 40.77105°N 73.98088°W

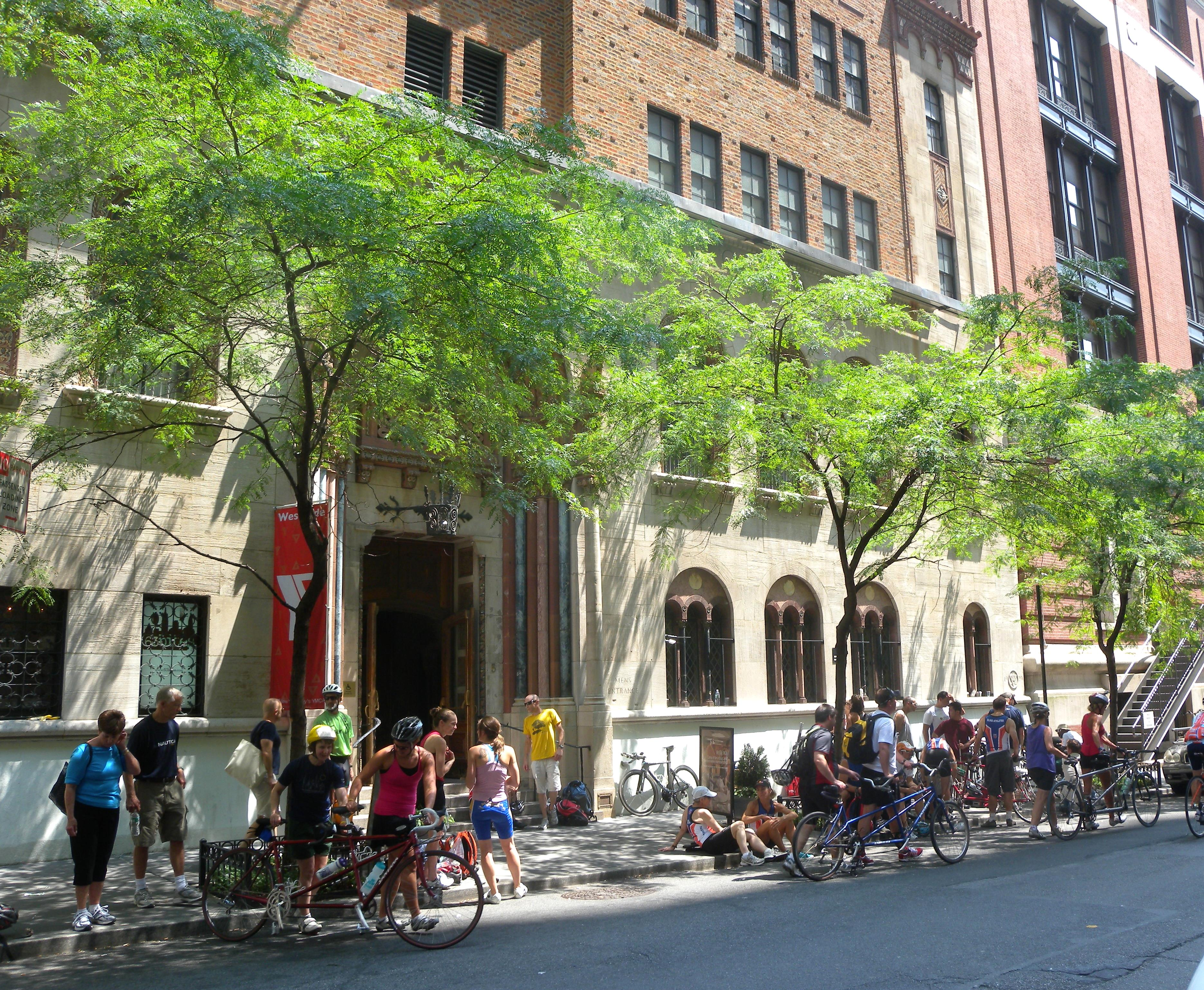

Information
- Established: 1916
- Closed: 1988
- Gender: Boys (1916-1973); Mixed (1973-1988)

McBurney School was a boys (later co-educational) college-preparatory school in Manhattan run by the YMCA of Greater New York. Its name commemorates Robert Ross McBurney, a prominent New York YMCA leader during the late 19th century.

== History ==
"Established in 1916 as a part of the educational program of the YMCA of Greater New York, McBurney School commemorated in its name one of the pioneers in work with boys and young men during the latter years of the nineteenth century, the first paid secretary of the YMCA of New York. For many years the School was a part of the education department of the West Side Branch, first on West 57th Street and then, in 1929, at 5 West 63rd Street where a separate portion of the larger building was prepared for the School. By 1935 the educational work of the City Association had increased to a point where a Schools Branch was justified. The direction of this Branch centered in McBurneys' 15 West 63rd Street building and provided for the operation of four, sometimes five, schools. This arrangement continued until, by 1957, increases in enrollment called for the accommodation of 450 boys. It was decided, therefore, to discontinue all of the departments except McBurney and the Evening High School and to prepare in 15 West 63rd street a proper setting for a college preparatory school. In September, 1958, the first part of the renovation was finished, and the building at 15 West 63rd Street was ready for McBurney use."

With the construction of Lincoln Center only a block to the west, the value of the school property increased dramatically after 1965. McBurney went co-ed in 1973. In the mid-1980s the YMCA sold the property for residential development. In spite of mergers and a move to 20 West End Avenue, The New York Times reported that McBurney shut its doors and auctioned off its contents on August 3, 1988.

"The closed school was the product of a merger between the 60-year-old McBurney School and the Baldwin School...The combined institution later merged with the Riverside and Carnegie Hill Schools, under a parent organization called the Baldwin League of Independent Schools... the organization paid $5.5 million for the four-story building on West End Avenue at 60th Street, spent $3.8 million on remodeling and moved in two years ago...the decision to close was made last week... the school's location – in a neighborhood of automobile dealers, parking lots and taxicab repair shops – had turned out to be a 'detriment.' In the library yesterday, bidders flipped through old yearbooks, hunting pictures of such well-known McBurney alumni as Felix Rohatyn, the chairman of the Municipal Assistance Corporation, and Henry Winkler, the actor known as The Fonz. Mr. Giannone found the yearbook showing a member of the class of 1956 whose nickname was Dumbo. The name was listed as Ted Koppel, now of ABC News."

== Legacy ==
=== In popular culture ===
McBurney was Holden Caulfield's destination when he left all the equipment of the Pencey Prep fencing team on the subway in Salinger's novel The Catcher in the Rye.

== Administration & Faculty ==
Headmasters

- 1916–1918: Newel W. Edson
- 1918–1952: Thomas Hemenway – also oratory teacher
- 1920: Adolf Augustus Berle: Head of “Junior School”
- 1952–1962: Benjamin D. Chamberlin (retired Feb. 1, 1962)
- 1962-1972: James J. Quinn Jr., Ph.D.
- Aug 1972– May 1974: E. Duane Meyer, Ed.D
- June 1974 – 1983 Anthony F. Capraro III, Ph.D.
- Late 1983 Mar 1984: Andrew Thomas Carr Stifler
- Mar 1984–Mar 1988: Lawrence N. Tallamy
- 1982–1982 Andrew Thomas Carr Stifler

== Notable staff ==
- Earl Newsom: English and mathematics teacher 1923-4

== Notable alumni ==
- Richie Birkenhead (graduated 1983) – musician
- David Brion Davis – historian
- Robert De Niro – actor
- Stephen Edlich – artist; known for collages, sculptures, and prints
- Bran Ferren – designer and inventor
- James R. Gaines – writer; chief editor, Time, Life and People magazines
- Richard Goode (graduated c. 1960) – musician
- Ad-Rock (born Adam Keefe Horovitz) – musician
- Haynes Bonner Johnson (1931–2013) – Pulitzer Prize–winning columnist (The Washington Post); journalism professor, University of Maryland
- Gordon Joseloff (graduated 1963) – journalist
- Bill Knapp – political strategist, serving global and domestic clients, including heads of state and Forbes 100 companies
- Ted Koppel (born Edward James Koppel) (entered McBurney 1953, graduated 1956 at age 16) – ABC News anchor
- Paul F. Levy (attended eleventh and twelve grades, graduated in 1968) – former chied executive officer, Beth Israel Deaconess Medical Center
- Johnny Marks (1927) – composer; wrote the music to the song "Rudolph the Red-Nosed Reindeer"
- Martin Mayer (1943) – best-selling writer
- Alan Merrill (born Allan Preston Sachs) (attended ninth and part of tenth grades; classmates with 1967 graduates) – rock musician
- Felix George Rohatyn – investment banker and diplomat; engineered the bailout of the New York City fiscal crisis of 1975; U.S. ambassador to France (1997–2000)
- Earl Rose – composer
- J. D. Salinger (attended from 1932 to 1934) – writer
- John Sterling – sports broadcaster
- Lewis Thomas – physician
- Richard Thomas (attended grades ten through twelve, graduated about 1969) – actor, The Waltons television series
- Bruce Wasserstein (graduated 1964) – investment banker
- Henry Winkler (graduated 1963) – Emmy Award–winning actor
