= James K. Sebenius =

American economist

- Sebenius in 1990
- Occupations: Economist, academic

Academic background
- Education: Vanderbilt University (B.A.); Stanford University (M.E.); Harvard University (Ph.D.)

Academic work
- Institutions: Harvard University

James K. Sebenius is an American economist, currently the Gordon Donaldson Professor of Business Administration at Harvard Business School as well as co-founder and partner of Lax Sebenius LLC, specializes in analyzing and advising corporations and governments worldwide on their most complex and challenging negotiations.

== Education ==
Sebenius holds a B.A., summa cum laude, from Vanderbilt in mathematics, an M.S. in Engineering-Economic Systems from Stanford's Engineering School, and a Ph.D. from Harvard in business economic.

== Career ==
Formerly on the faculty of Harvard's Kennedy School of Government, Sebenius also currently serves as vice-chair and as a member of the executive committee of the Program on Negotiation (PON) at Harvard Law School. At PON, he chairs the university's annual Great Negotiator Award program, which has recognized negotiators such as Richard Holbrooke, Lakdhar Brahimi, George Mitchell, and Bruce Wasserstein. He also co-directs a project to extensively interview all former U.S. Secretaries of State— including James Baker, George Shultz, Henry Kissinger, Madeleine Albright, Colin Powell, Condoleezza Rice, and John Kerry—about their most challenging negotiations.

Sebenius is the author or co-author or editor of five books including 3-D Negotiation: Powerful Tools to Change the Game in Your Most Important Deals (Harvard Business School Press), The Manager as Negotiator: Bargaining for Cooperation and Competitive Gain (Free Press), Negotiating the Law of the Sea: Lessons in the Art and Science of Reaching Agreement (Harvard University Press, and recognized with the Harold and Margaret Sprout Award), and, most recently, Kissinger the Negotiator: Lessons from Dealmaking at the Highest Level (HarperCollins). Together with these books, his published output includes more than 250 items including articles, case studies, and negotiation simulations.

Most recently, his academic work has centered on the role of social media in shaping the theory and practice of negotiation. In May 2020, he co-chaired a Program on Negotiation conference on AI, Technology, and Negotiation, where he presented a panel discussion on "The Potentially Critical Roles of Social Media in Negotiation." In 2021, Sebenius published an article in the Negotiation Journal on "Dealmaking Disrupted: The Unexplored Power of Social Media in Negotiation", and along with co-authors Ben Cook, David Lax and Paul Levy he published a Harvard Business Review article outlining a "Playbook for Negotiators in the Social Media Era."

== Personal life ==
He is married to Nancy Buck; their children are Zander, Alyza, and Isaac.
