= William Stickney (board of directors member) =

William Stickney (April 11, 1827 – October 13, 1881), was the son-in-law of Amos Kendall, a co-founder of the Columbia Institution for the Deaf, a grammar school in Washington, DC, which became Gallaudet University. He was a member of the board of directors of Columbia Institution from its inception in 1857 until his death in 1881. He was the first secretary of the board of directors, and held the position throughout his entire tenure as director.

In May 1857, a house and a vacant lot owned by Stickney were rented and, along with another house, were used to start the Columbia Institution.

William Stickney was born on April 11, 1827, in Vassalborough, Maine, and married Jeannie E. Kendall, the oldest daughter of Amos Kendall, on January 15, 1852, in a ceremony that took place on Kendall Green. They had two children: William "Will" Soule Stickney (October 24, 1852 - July 20, 1880), and a second child who died at six months of age in 1854.

Stickney attended Waterville College (now Colby College) in Maine, from 1846 to 1849, then entered the senior class at the Columbian University in Washington, DC (now George Washington University) and graduated from that institution. He was admitted to the bar to practice law in St. Louis, Missouri in 1850. He worked as a government clerk from 1852 to 1857, then worked as personal secretary to Amos Kendall from 1852 until Kendall's death in 1869.

Stickney died on October 13, 1881, after a four-day illness.

He was descended from William Stickney who settled in Massachusetts in 1636, having come from the town of Stickney on the eastern coast of England.
