= Scott Cutlip =

American academic

Scott Munson Cutlip (July 15, 1915 in Buckhannon, West Virginia – August 18, 2000 in Madison, Wisconsin) was a pioneer in public relations education.

== Biography ==
Cutlip was born in Buckhannon, West Virginia, the son of Okey Scott Cutlip and Janet Munson. He was raised by his uncle George Carper Reger. Cutlip started in newspapers with the Buckhannon Record in 1933. Moving to Morgantown, West Virginia in 1935, he worked for the West Virginia Newspaper Publishing Company for three years. In 1939 he obtained a bachelor's degree in journalism and political science from Syracuse University. His career in public relations began in 1941 with the West Virginia State Road Commission. In Madison, Wisconsin he continued to study journalism and political science, earning a master's degree from the University of Wisconsin. In 1942 he entered the United States Army Air Forces, where he served with the Fifth Air Force from Australia.

He joined the faculty of the University of Wisconsin in 1946, teaching news editing and introducing the study of public relations. As Cutlip later explained,

"From 1947 through 1974 at Wisconsin it was my privilege to guide some 135 U.S. military officers, mostly U.S. Army, through their graduate programs — a program initiated by then Army Chief of Staff General Dwight D. Eisenhower on the recommendation of Arthur W. Page, an eminent public relations pioneer."

In 1952 he co-wrote the first edition of Effective Public Relations with Allen H. Center. This textbook was reissued in the 11th edition in 2012. In 1957 Cutlip produced a bibliography on public relations (updated in 1965), and in 1965 he authored a book on fundraising in the United States.

At the University of Georgia from 1976 to 1983, Cutlip served as dean of the Henry W. Grady College of Journalism and Mass Communication.

In 1994 and 1995 Cutlip published two histories of public relations that develop the practices through the stories of professional operators.

Cutlip was a member of the Public Relations Society of America and the Association for Education in Journalism and Mass Communication.

== Philosophy of public relations ==
Cutlip issued the call to study:

"Public relations strategies and tactics are increasingly used as weapons of power in our no-holds-barred political, economic, and cause competition in the public opinion marketplace, and thus deserve more scholarly scrutiny than they have had."

Cutlip expressed the opinion that public relations is a "vital cog in the nation’s information system" in the prologue to his book The Unseen Power. He describes the public system as consisting of "government – federal, state, and local, political parties, pressure groups, non-profit organizations, public relations personnel, and the channels of communication, manned by reporters, editors, and gatekeepers". He noted that since citizens depend on this system, practitioners have a social responsibility while they skilfully advocate on behalf of clients.

At best, a public relations counselor may inform a CEO or board of directors of a client firm of necessities when contending with negative public opinion. For instance, advice may avoid a loss of market share and thus prove valuable. More generally, public relations practitioners enrich public dialogue and consolidate the frayed threads of discord. Cutlip conceded that practice may contribute to congestion and corrosion of communication channels.

As practitioners of the craft, Cutlip listed "propagandist, press agent, public information officer, public relations or public affairs official, political campaign specialist, lobbyist". The occupations operate under conditions of free speech. In a democracy, it is the informed votes of citizens that rights a listing ship of state, according to Milton. Cutlip also cited Hugo Black of the U. S. Supreme Court re-affirming the free speech context of practitioners in 1961.

University colleagues Merrill Jensen and Merle Curti challenged Cutlip to defend devious tactics of public relations practitioners. They saw public relations for its corrosive effect of undermining public trust and leading to cynicism. For his part, Cutlip noted that "only through the expertise of public relations can causes, industries, individuals and institutions make their voices heard in the public forum where thousands of shrill, competing voices daily recreate the Tower of Babel."

"The impact of public relations counselling can be seen ... in the more socially responsible business leadership that emerged in the wake of the Depression and the New Deal."

== Awards ==
In 1971 Cutlip was presented the honorary degree Litt. D. by West Virginia Wesleyan College of Buckhannon.

In 1972 Cutlip was recognized with the first Outstanding Educator Award presented by the Public Relations Society of America.

In 1984 he received the Commander's Award for Public Service from the Department of the Army and in 2003 was inducted into the U.S. Army Public Affairs Hall of Fame.

In 1987 he was nominated to the Hall of Fame of the Arthur W. Page Society.

In 1990 Cutlip was admitted to the College of Fellows of the Public Relations Society of America. In 1995 the Society presented him with its Golden Anvil award. That year the International Association of Business Communicators presented him with a special award to commemorate the 25th anniversary of the Association.

In recognition of his contributions to journalism education, he was elected a member of the Wisconsin Newspaper Association Hall of Fame.

== Personal life ==
Cutlip married Erna K. Flader of Wauwatosa, Wisconsin on May 21, 1947. Erna Cutlip died in 1997. Scott was diagnosed with cancer several months before his death.

== Legacy ==
The Scott Cutlip Scholarship is awarded to students at the University of Wisconsin–Madison with an interest in public relations.

Cutlip's contributions to public relations are commemorated in a special 1991 issue of Public Relations Review.

== Works ==
- 1952: (with Allen H. Center) Effective Public Relations, Prentice Hall (8th edition in 2000).
- 1965: Fundraising in the United States, its role in America's philanthropy, 553 p, Rutgers University Press.
- 1965: Public Relations Bibliography, second edition, 305 p, University of Wisconsin Press.
- 1994: The Unseen Power: Public Relations: A History, Lawrence Erlbaum Associates ISBN 0-8058-1464-7 .
- 1995: Public Relations History: from the 17th to the 20th Century, Lawrence Erlbaum Associates ISBN 0-8058-1780-8 .
