= Michael A. Wheeler =

Teacher at Harvard Business School

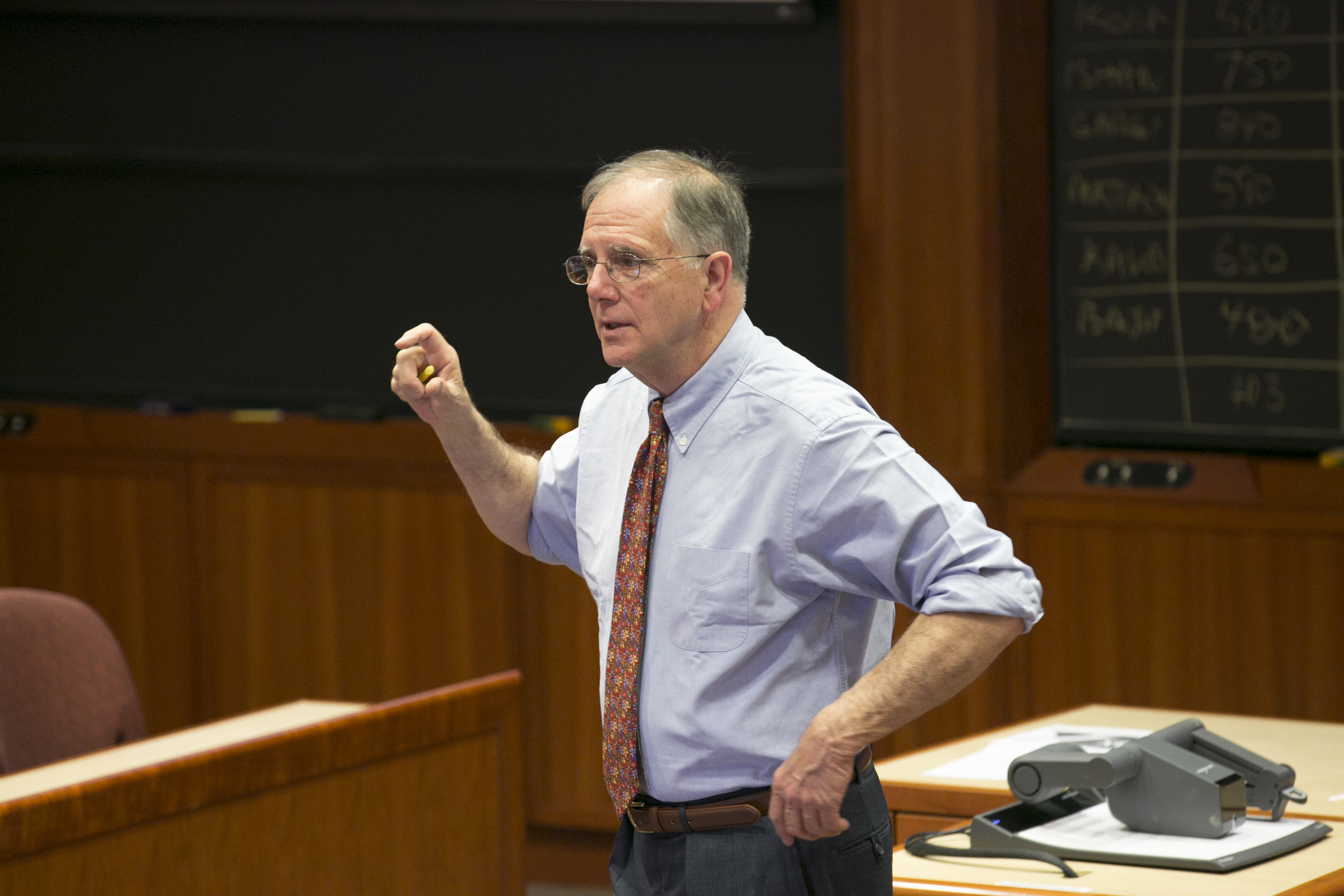
- Born: July 25, 1943 (age 83); Gloucester, Massachusetts, U.S.
- Education: Harvard Law School; Boston University; Amherst College
- Scientific career
- Workplaces: Harvard Business School

Michael A. Wheeler (born July 25, 1943) has taught negotiation at Harvard Business School in its MBA program, executive courses, and, more recently, its digital learning platform HBX. His work focuses on negotiation pedagogy, improvisation in complex dynamic processes, ethics and moral decisionmaking, and a range of alternative dispute resolution (ADR) processes. For twenty years he was the Editor in Chief of Negotiation Journal, published by the Program on Negotiation at Harvard Law School.

== Early life and education ==
Wheeler grew up in Gloucester, Massachusetts, where he still lives. He earned a BA in American Studies from Amherst College, a JD from Boston University, and an LLM in Public Policy Analysis from Harvard Law School.

== Career ==
=== Teacher ===
Wheeler has taught at Harvard Business School since 1993—first as a Visiting Professor, and then as a Professor of Management. He was awarded a chair—endowed by the MBA Class of 1952 —which he held until 2013. Since then he has continued his teaching at HBS as a Senior Fellow. He previously served as faculty chair of the school's first-year MBA program, where he taught its required course on negotiation. He has also been a visiting professor at Harvard Law School, Harvard Kennedy School of Government, Politecnico di Torino (Facolta di Architettura), and University of Colorado Law School.

One of Wheeler's areas of focus is negotiation pedagogy. In 2005 he delivered the keynote address ("Is Teaching Negotiation Too Hard, Too Easy, or Both?") at an international conference in Paris called "New Trends in Negotiation Teaching: Toward a Trans-Atlantic Network." Wheeler edited the essay collection Teaching Negotiation: Ideas and Innovation. He is currently co-director of the Pedagogy Initiative at the Program on Negotiation at Harvard Law School, and Senior Advisor for Teaching Innovation at the Consensus Building Institute (where he was previously a founding board member and chairman). His teaching materials (including simulations, case studies, videos, and computer-based exercises) are used in business schools and professional programs throughout the United States and other countries. In February 2017, Harvard Business School's HBX distance learning platform launched Wheeler's online course Negotiation Mastery: Unlocking Value in the Real World. Wheeler also created the mobile app Negotiation 360, a self-assessment negotiation/best practices tool.

=== Editor ===
Wheeler was the editor-in-chief of Negotiation Journal from 1995 until 2015, when he took Emeritus status.

== Publications ==
=== Books ===
Wheeler has written or co-written eleven books on negotiation topics. They include:

- Art of Negotiation: How to Improvise Agreement in a Chaotic World
- What's Fair: Ethics for Negotiators (with Carrie Menkel-Meadow)
- Negotiation (Harvard Business Essentials Series)
- Environmental Dispute Resolution (with Lawrence S. Bacow)

==== Art of Negotiation ====
Art of Negotiation: How to Improvise Agreement in a Chaotic World was the subject of interviews in The Washington Post and the Financial Times, and of reviews by Professor Leonard Riskin, World Economic Forum, and Publishers Weekly, the last of which stated:

[Art of Negotiation] offers a clear-headed, creative approach to negotiation that is on a par with the canonical texts, Getting to Yes and You Can Negotiate Anything. Those titles suggest abandoning hardball tactics and turning every interaction into a negotiation. Wheeler, on the other hand, posits that the most important aspect of negotiation is improvisation and constant flexibility, acknowledging that each party goes into a negotiation without truly understanding the other person's position. Often, each party's real needs don't emerge until the negotiations are in progress. Wheeler discusses strategies for managing uncertainty and understanding the true extent to which preferences, needs, and relationships are constantly changing. He steers readers toward making wise decisions about whether or not to pursue a negotiation in the first place, conducting sufficient research, keeping their cool, and closing the deal. Wheeler's lucid, engaging voice is a major asset, and sample scripts help drive home his points.

=== Articles ===
Wheeler has written over 30 articles on negotiation and public policy issues for a wide range of academic journals and the popular publications, including:

- "Negotiating with Emotion" (with Kimberlyn Leary and Julianna Pillemer), Harvard Business Review, vol. 91, nos. 1–2 (January–February 2013): 96–103.
- "Crossing the Threshold: First Impressions in Psychoanalysis and Negotiation" (with Kimberlyn Leary), Journal of Applied Psychoanalytic Studies, vol. 5, no. 1 (January 2003): 81–105.
- "Sport Strikes: Let the Games Continue" (with James Sebenius), New York Times, (October 30, 1994), Section F, 9.
- "Trading the Poor: Intermunicipal Housing Negotiation in New Jersey" (with Patrick Field and Jennifer Gilbert), Harvard Negotiation Law Review, vol. 2 (1997): 1–34.
- "Negotiating NIMBYs: Learning from the Failure of the Massachusetts Siting Law," Yale Journal on Regulation, vol. 11, no. 2 (winter 1994): 241–291.
- "Primaries and Opinion Polls," Atlantic Monthly (May 1972).

== Awards and honors ==
- Robert F. Greenhill Award (2004), awarded by the Harvard Business School faculty for contributions to the school's mission.
- Best Negotiation Book of the Year (1984), awarded by the International Institute for Conflict Prevention & Resolution-Alternative Dispute Resolution (CPR-ADR), for Environmental Dispute Resolution (with Lawrence S. Bacow).

== Other appointments ==
- International Steering Committee of Afghanistan Center for Dispute Resolution (Kabul)
- Advisory Council of the Moscow-based Center for Mediation and Law
- Advisory Council of the ADR Center in Rome
- Advisory Board of the Central European Review of Economics and Management

== Media appearances ==
From 1976 to 1991, Wheeler was a weekly commentator on the WGBH (Boston) 10 O'clock News, analyzing public opinion polls and policy issues. (He is a forty-year member of SAG-AFTRA.) In addition, he has appeared on Good Morning America, All Things Considered, and the PBS Newshour.
