= Paul F. Levy =

Paul F. Levy is an American businessman, author, professor, and was elected on Nov 2, 2021 to a two-year term (Jan 2022 to Dec 2023) for the Ward 6 seat on the Newton (MA) School Committee, and was re-elected two years later for a second term. He is noted for his use of social media in health care leadership roles, and has been the subject of academic research and Harvard Business School case studies about the role of social media in important and complex negotiations.

== Education ==
Paul F. Levy is a graduate of McBurney School in New York City in 1968 and of Massachusetts Institute of Technology in 1974.

== Career ==
Levy's career after graduation included serving as Deputy Director of the MA Energy Policy Office and Director of the Arkansas Department of Energy. He returned to MA and then served as chairman of the Massachusetts Department of Public Utilities from 1983–87, Executive Director of the Mass Water Resources Authority from 1988-1992, adjunct professor at MIT from 1992-1998, and, in 1998, became executive dean for administration at Harvard Medical School. He is the co-author of Negotiating Environmental Agreements, which was published in 1999. He was a member of the MIT Corporation and up until September 2017, a board member of ISO New England.

Levy was executive director of the Massachusetts Water Resources Authority, where he was famous for leading the "Boston Harbor Cleanup". He published a description of conditions that led to sewage treatment facilities failures he dubbed the Nut Island effect in 2001.

Levy assumed a position as president and CEO of Beth Israel Deaconess Medical Center in 2002. At BIDMC, Levy became one of the earliest hospital CEO's to write his own blog, which he started in August 2006. Via this blog he led the first blog rally on end of life matters. He has taken very public positions on topics such as the transparency of clinical outcomes and he also voiced his opposition to SEIU's efforts to unionize BIDMC employees. His strategic use of a blog to oppose unionization has been the subject of a book, as well as academic research focused on the role, power, potential and perils of social media in negotiation.

Levy received national attention in 2009 for leading the workers at BIDMC to avoid hundreds of layoffs by engaging them in the crowdsourcing of ideas to save money as the hospital faced deficits due to the national recession. Workers agreed to make extra sacrifices to insulate the lowest paid workers in the hospital from reductions in wages and benefits.

On January 7, 2011, he announced that he would be resigning from BIDMC. In a blog post, Levy said that he recently had time to reflect during a biking trip through Africa and had decided to move on to new challenges after nine years with Beth Israel. "Last night, I informed the Chair of our Board that I will be stepping down as CEO. We will work out an appropriate transition period, and things will continue to run smoothly here. I leave confident that the Board will find many able candidates to succeed me." Levy continued writing his blog after leaving BIDMC, renaming it "Not Running a Hospital," broadening its reach to focus on health care policy matters and clinical practice improvement throughout the world.

In 2012, Levy published Goal Play! Leadership Lessons from the Soccer Field, a book that offers insights from sports, health care, business, and government to help leaders get better outcomes. As a practical guide to improved leadership, the book highlights unconventional thinking and actions that can be used to bring about outstanding results. In 2013, Levy published How A Blog Held Off the Most Powerful Union in America, presenting the story of how he used social media to fend off a corporate campaign by the Service Employees International Union. In 2014, Levy and Farzana Mohamed published How to Negotiate Your First Job, a guide to young professionals entering the work force.

In September 2015, he announced that the focus of the blog would shift to negotiation theory and practice, leadership training and mentoring, and teaching. On March 15, 2016, he announced that he would discontinue the blog to focus on other interests.

Levy is often invited by health care organizations throughout the world to give speeches on eliminating preventable harm, transparency of clinical outcomes, and front-line driven process improvement. He was invited to be a Thinker in Residence at Deakin University in Victoria, Australia, from November 2015 through March 2016.

In 2018, he published Don't Sign Anything: A Guide for the Day You Are Laid Off, which provides advice on negotiating severance deals.

In 2020, his work on the use of social media in complex or important negotiations was featured in a case study presented at a Program on Negotiation working conference on AI, Technology, and Negotiation. In 2021, this case study appeared in an article in the Negotiation Journal titled "Dealmaking Disrupted: The Unexplored Power of Social Media in Negotiation" and in a Harvard Business Review article titled "A Playbook for Negotiators in the Social Media Era," co-authored with James Sebenius, David Lax and Ben Cook.

He is currently senior adviser at Lax Sebenius LLC, a negotiation consultancy firm co-founded by David Lax and James Sebenius. He was a Professor of the Practice at the D'Amore-McKim School of Business at Northeastern University. He was also a visiting professor at the Institute of Global Health Innovation at Imperial College London and an honorary professor with the Australian Institute of Health Innovation in the Faculty of Medicine and Health Sciences at Macquarie University in Sydney, Australia.

== Legacy ==
Levy's leadership record at BIDMC, including his use of social media as a management tool, was the subject of a case study published in November 2010 by The Health Foundation, an independent charity working to improve the quality of healthcare in the United Kingdom. David A. Garvin and Michael A. Roberto of Harvard Business School had previously produced a multimedia case study on Levy's turn-around of BIDMC in 2002.

He is a current resident of Newton, Massachusetts.

== Personal life ==
Levy married Farzana Mohamed in December 2012. Mohamed and Levy had known each other since she was an MIT undergrad and he was her academic adviser. Mohamed had also been hired by Levy as an employee in 2002 when he was the CEO of Beth Israel Deaconess Medical Center.

== Controversy ==
Levy admitted on May 5, 2010, to poor judgement in his role as CEO of BIDMC, because he had hired and promoted a female employee with whom he had an allegedly inappropriate relationship. He was fined $50,000 but given a vote of confidence by the Board of BIDMC. Levy also issued an apology on his blog.
