= Situation-Behavior-Impact =

Workplace feedback model

Situation–Behavior–Impact
- Abbreviation: SBI
- Type: Feedback model
- Developer: Center for Creative Leadership
- Key publication: Feedback That Works (2000)
- Variants: SBII (Situation–Behavior–Impact–Intent); SBIA (Situation–Behavior–Impact–Action)

Situation-Behavior-Impact (SBI) is a structured method for giving interpersonal feedback, used mainly in management, leadership development and coaching. Developed by the Center for Creative Leadership (CCL), it asks the person giving feedback to describe three things in turn: the specific situation in which an event occurred, the observable behavior of the recipient, and the impact that behavior had on the giver or others. "SBI" and "Situation-Behavior-Impact" are trademarks of the CCL.

The model is intended to replace vague, judgmental or personal remarks with concrete descriptions of actions and their consequences. It is widely reproduced in management training materials and has been adapted for other settings, including medical education.

== History ==
SBI originated at the Center for Creative Leadership, a nonprofit leadership-development organization based in Greensboro, North Carolina. The method was set out in Feedback That Works: How to Build and Deliver Your Message, a short guidebook by Sloan R. Weitzel published by CCL in 2000 as part of its Ideas Into Action series. The guidebook states that feedback "should enable the receiver to walk away understanding exactly what he or she did and what impact it had on you."

CCL later produced sector-specific versions, such as Feedback That Works for Nonprofit Organizations (2013) by Shera Clark, and offers workshop materials under the Feedback That Works name. In 2025 CCL authors described an extension, SBII, which adds a fourth step of inquiring about the recipient's intent.

== Method ==
The three steps of the model are usually described as follows:

Situation
The giver identifies when and where the behavior took place (for example, "In this morning's team meeting…"). Anchoring the feedback in a specific moment is intended to make it concrete and to help the recipient recall the event.
Behavior
The giver describes what the person actually did or said, in terms that could be observed or recorded, without interpreting motives or labelling character. CCL contrasts observable behavior (e.g. "you interrupted Sam twice") with judgments (e.g. "you were rude").
Impact
The giver explains the effect of the behavior on themselves, on others or on the work, for example how it made them feel or what consequence followed.

The model can be used for both positive (reinforcing) and negative (corrective) feedback. According to CCL material, the approach is meant to remove "personal attacks, incorrect judgments, vague statements, and third-party slights" from feedback conversations.

=== Example ===
A typical illustration of corrective SBI feedback is: "During yesterday's client presentation (situation), you skipped the budget slides when the client asked about costs (behavior). The client seemed confused and asked for a follow-up call, which delayed the decision (impact)."

== Variants ==
SBII (Situation–Behavior–Impact–Intent)
Promoted by CCL, this adds a final step in which the giver asks about the recipient's original intention, turning the exchange into a two-way conversation and allowing both parties to "explore the gap together between intentions vs. impact."
SBIA (Situation–Behavior–Impact–Action)
Some users add a fourth element of suggested actions or next steps. A 2021 study of emergency department teaching used an SBIA framework to analyze written feedback to trainees.

== Reception and evidence ==
=== Claimed benefits ===
CCL describes SBI as "research-based" and states that it reduces anxiety for the feedback giver and defensiveness in the recipient; CCL authors also report that employees rate managers who give feedback more frequently as more effective. Proponents emphasize that the model is simple and easy to teach.

The model's focus on observable behavior rather than personal traits is consistent with broader feedback research. A widely cited 1996 meta-analysis by Avraham Kluger and Angelo DeNisi found that feedback interventions improved performance on average but reduced it in more than a third of cases, and proposed that feedback is less effective when it directs the recipient's attention away from the task and toward the self. That study concerned feedback interventions in general and did not evaluate SBI specifically.

=== Application studies ===
In the 2021 emergency-department study, researchers analyzed 928 narrative feedback records written by 14 clinical teachers between 2017 and 2019. Only 0.75% contained all four SBIA elements; most records (about 54%) described behavior alone. The authors recommended more structured feedback following the full model.

=== Limitations and criticism ===
Commentators have noted several limitations:

- Narrow scope. Not all feedback can be reduced to a single behavior at a specific moment; broader patterns or complex situations may call for a different approach, such as the Pendleton model, which builds in self-reflection and dialogue.
- First-hand observation required. Because the impact step describes the giver's own experience, the method is best suited to situations the giver witnessed directly; a manager relaying reports from others may need a different technique.
- One-directional delivery. The basic three-step form does not address the recipient's intent or perspective, which can lead to misinterpretation; this is the rationale for the SBII extension.
- Rigidity and context. Coaching practitioners caution against applying the formula mechanically, ignoring cultural differences in communication, delivering feedback long after the event, or omitting follow-up.

== See also ==
- Feedback
- Performance appraisal
- 360-degree feedback
- Nonviolent Communication
- Feedback sandwich
