= Conflict resolution =

Facilitating a peaceful outcome to a dispute

Conflict resolution is conceptualized as the methods and processes involved in facilitating the peaceful ending of conflict and retribution.

Committed group members attempt to resolve group conflicts by actively communicating information about their conflicting motives or ideologies to the rest of group (e.g., intentions; reasons for holding certain beliefs) and by engaging in collective negotiation. Dimensions of resolution typically parallel the dimensions of conflict in the way the conflict is processed.

Cognitive resolution is the way disputants understand and view the conflict, with beliefs, perspectives, understandings and attitudes. Emotional resolution is in the way disputants feel about a conflict, the emotional energy. Behavioral resolution is reflective of how the disputants act, their behavior. Ultimately a wide range of methods and procedures for addressing conflict exist, including negotiation, mediation, mediation-arbitration, diplomacy, and creative peacebuilding.

== Definition and characteristics ==
Communication can be understood in a pragmatic or transactional way. There is a distinction between paraconflict, which is symbolic, and conflict, which is actions you can observe. Symbolic conflict is categorized as constructive or destructive, depending on the individual's emotional response to it. In contrast, action conflict is determined to be constructive or destructive based on how it functions within the system. Ruben viewed communication as continual and inevitable. Conflict refers to "the discrepancies between the demands and/or capabilities of the system and the demands and/or capacities of the environment." Conflict is a necessary process for a system to function, as adaptation in communication flows constantly; there is a strong correlation between adaptability and conflict.

== Models ==
=== Modes ===
Conflict modes according to Thomas & Kilmann

Ruble and Thomas transposed the managerial grid model in terms of conflict resolution. They adapted the classification scheme to dimensions identified in conflict research that represent a range of behaviors beyond the dichotomy between cooperation and competition. The X-axis evaluates cooperativity, the extent by which mutual goals are achieved. The Y-axis evaluates assertiveness, how parties insist on carrying their own objectives.

Thomas and Kilmann extended that grid with a rating system for five modes of behavior. When parties are assertive but their objectives lack compatibility, they become competitive; when parties are assertive toward compatible objectives, they can be collaborating; when no party prioritizes objectives that are mutually exclusive, they can display avoidance; parties can be accommodating when assertiveness is low but cooperativity is high; when there is no real bias toward assertiveness and cooperativity, compromising can obtain.

However, not every style leads to an acceptable result in every situation. For example, a collaboration does not work if the goals of the two conflict parties are immutable and mutually exclusive. The different styles have different advantages and disadvantages. Depending on the situation, different conflict styles can be considered desirable to achieve the best results.

=== Dual concern ===
The dual concern model of conflict resolution is a conceptual perspective that assumes individuals' preferred method of dealing with conflict is based on two underlying themes or dimensions: concern for self (assertiveness) and concern for others (empathy). According to the model, group members balance their concern for satisfying personal needs and interests with their concern for satisfying the needs and interests of others in different ways. The intersection of these two dimensions ultimately leads individuals towards exhibiting different styles of conflict resolution. The dual model identifies five group conflict resolution styles or strategies that individuals may use depending on their dispositions toward pro-self or pro-social goals.

Avoidance

Characterized by joking, changing or avoiding the topic, or even denying that a problem exists, the conflict avoidance style is used when an individual has withdrawn in dealing with the other party, when one is uncomfortable with conflict, or due to cultural contexts. (Note: For example, in Chinese culture, reasons for avoidance include sustaining a good mood, protecting the avoider, and other philosophical and spiritual reasonings (Feng and Wilson 2011).) During conflict, these avoiders adopt a "wait and see" attitude, often allowing conflict to phase out on its own without any personal involvement. By neglecting to address high-conflict situations, avoiders risk allowing problems to fester or spin out of control.

Accommodating

In contrast, yielding, "accommodating", smoothing or suppression conflict styles are characterized by a high level of concern for others and a low level of concern for oneself. This passive pro-social approach emerges when individuals derive personal satisfaction from meeting the needs of others and have a general concern for maintaining stable, positive social relationships. When faced with conflict, individuals with an accommodating conflict style tend to harmonize into others' demands out of respect for the social relationship. With this sense of yielding to the conflict, individuals fall back to others' input instead of finding solutions with their own intellectual resolution.

Competitive

The competitive, "fighting" or forcing conflict style maximizes individual assertiveness (i.e., concern for self) and minimizes empathy (i.e., concern for others). Groups consisting of competitive members generally enjoy seeking domination over others, and typically see conflict as a "win or lose" predicament. Fighters tend to force others to accept their personal views by employing competitive power tactics (arguments, insults, accusations or even violence) that foster intimidation.

Conciliation

The conciliation, "compromising", bargaining or negotiation conflict style is typical of individuals who possess an intermediate level of concern for both personal and others' outcomes. Compromisers value fairness and, in doing so, anticipate mutual give-and-take interactions. By accepting some demands put forth by others, compromisers believe this agreeableness will encourage others to meet them halfway, thus promoting conflict resolution. This conflict style can be considered an extension of both "yielding" and "cooperative" strategies.

Cooperation

Characterized by an active concern for both pro-social and pro-self behavior, the cooperation, integration, confrontation or problem-solving conflict style is typically used when an individual has elevated interests in their own outcomes as well as in the outcomes of others. During conflict, cooperators collaborate with others in an effort to find an amicable solution that satisfies all parties involved in the conflict. Individuals using this type of conflict style tend to be both highly assertive and highly empathetic. By seeing conflict as a creative opportunity, collaborators willingly invest time and resources into finding a "win-win" solution. According to the literature on conflict resolution, a cooperative conflict resolution style is recommended above all others. This resolution may be achieved by lowering the aggressor's guard while raising the ego.

=== Regret analysis ===
The conflict resolution curve derived from an analytical model that offers a peaceful solution by motivating conflicting entities. Forced resolution of conflict might invoke another conflict in the future.

Conflict resolution curve (CRC) separates conflict styles into two separate domains: domain of competing entities and domain of accommodating entities. There is a sort of agreement between targets and aggressors on this curve. Their judgements of badness compared to goodness of each other are analogous on CRC. So, arrival of conflicting entities to some negotiable points on CRC is important before peace building. CRC does not exist (i.e., singular) in reality if the aggression of the aggressor is certain. Under such circumstances it might lead to apocalypse with mutual destruction.

The curve explains why nonviolent struggles ultimately toppled repressive regimes and sometimes forced leaders to change the nature of governance. Also, this methodology has been applied to capture conflict styles on the Korean Peninsula and dynamics of negotiation processes.

=== Four-sides ===
In the third step, the actual conflict of interest is identified and mutual understanding for the interest of the other party is developed. This requires understanding and respecting the underlying values and motivations. According to the four-sides model by Friedemann Schulz von Thun, there are two levels of information in every statement: the content level and the emotional or relationship level. Both levels contain interests, the differences of which to the other conflict party should be balanced as much as possible. Then a win-win solution for the conflict can be developed together.

=== Circle of Conflict ===
Christopher W. Moore's "Circle of conflict" model, first published in 1986, emphasizes five sources of conflict:

- data: information, interpretation, incompleteness;
- relationship: personal dynamics, miscommunication, misbehaviors;
- value: incompatible beliefs, principles, or priorities;
- structure: organization failures, power imbalances, resource constraints;
- interests: needs, desires, incentives, procedures.

Conflicts may have multiple sources. Identifying the source of the conflict ought to facilitate its resolution.

=== Nonviolent communication (NVC) ===
NVC evolved from concepts used in person-centered therapy. Nonviolent Communication is both used as a clinical psychotherapy modality and also offered in workshops for the general public, particularly in regard to seeking harmony in relationships and at workplaces. It can also be applied in daily life to reduce stress. Sometimes, whole communities are founded upon its principles. NVC has been applied in clinical, educational, organisational and community settings and has been the subject of small trials and scoping reviews that report improvements in self-reported empathy and interpersonal outcomes; however, the evidence base is heterogeneous and reviewers have called for larger, longer and more rigorous studies, and for attention to cultural adaptation and trauma-sensitive implementation.

== Theories ==
=== Relational dialectics ===
Relational dialectics is an interpersonal communication theory about close personal ties and relationships that highlights the tensions, struggles, and interplay between contrary tendencies. The theory, proposed by Leslie Baxter and Barbara Montgomery in 1988, defines communication patterns between relationship partners as the result of endemic dialectical tensions. Dialectics are described as the tensions an individual feels when experiencing paradoxical desires that we need and/ or want.

The main concepts of relational dialectics are:

- Contradictions – The concept is that the contrary has the characteristics of its opposite. People can seek to be in a relationship but still need their space.
- Totality – The totality comes when the opposites unite. Thus, the relationship is balanced with contradictions and only then it reaches totality
- Process – Comprehended through various social processes. These processes simultaneously continue within a relationship in a recurring manner.
- Praxis – The relationship progresses with experience and both people interact and communicate effectively to meet their needs. Praxis is a concept of practicability in making decisions in a relationship despite opposing wants and needs

=== Strategy of conflict ===
Thomas Schelling applied game theory to situations where the outcome is not zero-sum.

- Conflict is a contest. Rational behavior, in this contest, is a matter of judgment and perception.
- Strategy makes predictions using "rational behavior – behavior motivated by a serious calculation of advantages, a calculation that in turn is based on an explicit and internally consistent value system".
- Cooperation is always temporary, interests will change.

=== Ripeness ===
The Ripeness theory by I. William Zartman introduces the concept of a "ripe moment" for the commencement of peace negotiations in a conflict, a necessary (but not sufficient) condition that must be fulfilled before actors in a conflict will be willing to faithfully engage in peace negotiations. The ripe moment requires: (1) a stalemate, where none of the actors can achieve victory and conflict continuation is mutually hurting; (2) a way out, where actors can provide the necessary security that enables peace negotiation to occur.

Without these features, Zartman argues that belligerents will lack the necessary motivations to pursue peace. Therefore, the sides in a conflict will either not engage in peace negotiation, or any peace will be short-lived. Approached in game-theoretical terms, Zartman argues that the presence of an mutually hurting stalemate and a means of escaping the stalemate transform conflicts from a prisoner's dilemma to a chicken game. The durability of ceasefires can depend on the continued existence of a mutually enticing opportunity (MEO) and resolution of substantive grievances. Changes in the perceived cost-benefit analysis can result in resolution of intractable or decade-long conflicts, such as The Troubles. The Ripeness theory has been criticized for limited predictivity when time and conditions are ripe for peace.

=== Mechanisms ===
One theory discussed within the field of peace and conflict studies is conflict resolution mechanisms: independent procedures in which the conflicting parties can have confidence. They can be formal or informal arrangements with the intention of resolving the conflict. In Understanding Conflict Resolution Wallensteen draws from the works of Lewis A. Coser, Johan Galtung and Thomas Schelling, and presents seven distinct theoretical mechanisms for conflict resolutions:

1. A shift in priorities for one of the conflicting parties. While it is rare that a party completely changes its basic positions, it can display a shift in to what it gives highest priority. In such an instance new possibilities for conflict resolutions may arise.
2. The contested resource is divided. In essence, this means both conflicting parties display some extent of shift in priorities which then opens up for some form of "meeting the other side halfway" agreement.
3. Horse-trading between the conflicting parties. This means that one side gets all of its demands met on one issue, while the other side gets all of its demands met on another issue.
4. The parties decide to share control, and rule together over the contested resource. It could be permanent, or a temporary arrangement for a transition period that, when over, has led to a transcendence of the conflict.
5. The parties agree to leave control to someone else. In this mechanism the primary parties agree, or accept, that a third party takes control over the contested resource.
6. The parties resort to conflict resolution mechanisms, notably arbitration or other legal procedures. This means finding a procedure for resolving the conflict through some of the previously mentioned five ways, but with the added quality that it is done through a process outside of the parties' immediate control.
7. Some issues can be left for later. The argument for this is that political conditions and popular attitudes can change, and some issues can gain from being delayed, as their significance may pale with time.

Nicholson notes that a conflict is resolved when the inconsistency between wishes and actions of parties is resolved. Negotiation is an important part of conflict resolution, and any design of a process which tries to incorporate positive conflict from the start needs to be cautious not to let it degenerate into the negative types of conflict. Actual conflict resolutions range from discussions between the parties involved, such as in mediations or collective bargaining, to violent confrontations such as in interstate wars or civil wars. "Between" these are the variants of lawful or courtly clarification, which by no means have to take the form of "mud fights", but can be handled as "professional delegation" of the problem to lawyers, in order to relieve oneself from the time-consuming and strenuous clarification procedure. Many conflicts can be resolved without escalation by the parties involved. If the conflict parties do not come to a solution themselves, accompanying measures can be taken by third parties.

The goal of conflict resolution is an effective and lasting solution to the conflict. This is achieved through the satisfaction of all parties involved, which ideally results in constructively working together on the problem (collaboration, cooperation). In addition, a regulation of the conflict can occur through a decision by an authority, e.g., by an arbitrator, a court, a parent, or a supervisor. Unprocessed conflicts generate frustration and aggression, which can result in cost, damage, and scapegoats.

== Praxis ==
=== De-escalation ===
The first step in a dispute is usually de-escalation (e.g., cessation of hostilities, reduction of open aggression). A reciprocal tit for tat strategy ("an eye for an eye") can build trust between groups in the case of mutually collaborative or mutually competitive conflict styles. To facilitate a change of positions in a conflict party, face-saving bridges should be built, e.g., by discussing what has already changed since the beginning of conflict resolution or by introducing common fair behavioral norms.

Escalating behavior should not be reacted to immediately, to give the person or persons time to regain emotional self-control, making them more accessible to arguments and avoiding mutual escalation. Anger can be reduced by an apology, humor, a recess, common behavioral norms, greater distance (switch to online discussion), or by background information that the escalation of the other side was not intended. Afterwards, the problematic behavior can be addressed in a calm manner, followed by an acknowledgment of those substantive points of the escalating person that are correct. Alternatively, a feedback sandwich can be used.

In the case of avoiding behavior, more questions should be asked and more attention should be paid to the participation of these persons in the conflict resolution and to their immaterial interests (such as recognition and autonomy). In the conversation, a reminder can be given for motivation that the processing of the conflict serves the satisfaction of the interests of both sides.

=== Regulated communication ===
The second step is the initiation of communication between the conflicting parties, often through mediation. Accompanying conditions are described in Roger Fisher and William Ury's seminal 1981 book Getting to Yes: Negotiating Agreement Without Giving In. Alternatively, the moderation cycle according to Josef W. Seifert can be followed. Furthermore, I-messages can be alternated with active listening according to Thomas Gordon or nonviolent communication according to Marshall B. Rosenberg can be used to depersonalize a discussion.

=== Glasl's management strategies ===
Glasl, on the other hand, assigns six strategies for conflict management to the nine escalation stages of Friedrich Glasl's model of conflict escalation.

- Level 1-3 (hardening, polarization & debate, actions instead of words): Moderation
- Level 3-5 (actions instead of words, concern about image & coalitions, loss of face): Process support
- Level 4-6 (concern about image & coalitions, loss of face, threatening strategies): socio-therapeutic process support
- Level 5-7 (loss of face, threatening strategies, limited destructive strikes): conciliation/mediation
- Level 6-8 (threatening strategies, limited destructive strikes, fragmentation): arbitration/judicial proceedings
- Level 7-9 (limited destructive strikes, fragmentation, together into the abyss): power intervention

=== Interest-based relational approach (IBR) ===
Developed by Fisher and Ury in Getting to Yes, the IBR approach originated from work at the Harvard Negotiation Project. It has four core tactics:

- separate the people from the problem;
- focus on interests, not positions;
- find options for mutual gain;
- insist on using objective criteria.

The Harvard Negotiation Project was one of the founding entities of the Program on Negotiation (PON) at Harvard Law School in 1983.

=== Forcing ===
When one of the conflict's parts firmly pursues his or her own concerns despite the resistance of the other(s). This may involve pushing one viewpoint at the expense of another or maintaining firm resistance to the counterpart's actions; it is also commonly known as "competing". Forcing may be appropriate when all other, less forceful methods, do not work or are ineffective; when someone needs to stand up for his/her own rights (or the represented group/organization's rights), resist aggression and pressure. It may be also considered a suitable option when a quick resolution is required and using force is justified (e.g. in a life-threatening situation, to stop an aggression), and as a very last resort to resolve a long-lasting conflict.

However, forcing may also negatively affect the relationship with the opponent in the long run; may intensified the conflict if the opponent decides to react in the same way (even if it was not the original intention); it does not allow to take advantage in a productive way of the other side's position and, last but not least, taking this approach may require a lot of energy and be exhausting to some individuals. Additionally, research shows that highly adversarial conflict behaviors are associated with dysregulated daily cortisol patterns, which may indicate chronic physiological stress. The biological strain studied suggests that consistently resorting to forcing or competing methods to resolve conflicts may contribute to long-term health consequences resulting from prolonged stress.

=== Win-win / collaborating ===
Collaboration involves an attempt to work with the other part involved in the conflict to find a win-win solution to the problem in hand, or at least to find a solution that most satisfies the concerns of both parties. The win-win approach sees conflict resolution as an opportunity to come to a mutually beneficial result; and it includes identifying the underlying concerns of the opponents and finding an alternative which meets each party's concerns. From that point of view, it is the most desirable outcome when trying to solve a problem for all partners. Also, positive conflict resolution can have a beneficial physiological effect on people. Research suggests that collaborative strategies lead to lower stress reactivity and healthier cortisol level patterns, resulting in long-term improvements in health.

Collaborating may be the best solution when consensus and commitment of other parties is important; when the conflict occurs in a collaborative, trustworthy environment and when it is required to address the interests of multiple stakeholders. But more specially, it is the most desirable outcome when a long-term relationship is important so that people can continue to collaborate in a productive way; collaborating is in few words, sharing responsibilities and mutual commitment. For parties involved, the outcome of the conflict resolution is less stressful; however, the process of finding and establishing a win-win solution may be longer and should be very involving.

It may require more effort and more time than some other methods; for the same reason, collaborating may not be practical when timing is crucial and a quick solution or fast response is required.

=== Compromising ===
Different from the win-win solution, in this outcome the conflict parties find a mutually acceptable solution which partially satisfies both parties. This can occur as both parties converse with one another and seek to understand the other's point of view. Compromising may be an optimal solution when the goals are moderately important and not worth the use of more assertive or more involving approaches. It may be useful when reaching temporary settlement on complex issues and as a first step when the involved parties do not know each other well or have not yet developed a high level of mutual trust. Compromising may be a faster way to solve things when time is a factor. The level of tensions can be lower as well, but the result of the conflict may be also less satisfactory.

If this method is not well managed, and the factor time becomes the most important one, the situation may result in both parties being not satisfied with the outcome (i.e. a lose-lose situation). Moreover, it does not contribute to building trust in the long run and it may require a closer monitoring of the kind of partially satisfactory compromises acquired.

=== Withdrawing ===
This technique consists on not addressing the conflict, postpone it or simply withdrawing; for that reason, it is also known as Avoiding. This outcome is suitable when the issue is trivial and not worth the effort or when more important issues are pressing, and one or both the parties do not have time to deal with it. Withdrawing may be also a strategic response when it is not the right time or place to confront the issue, when more time is needed to think and collect information before acting or when not responding may bring still some winnings for at least some of the involves parties. Moreover, withdrawing may be also employed when someone know that the other party is totally engaged with hostility and does not want (can not) to invest further unreasonable efforts.

Withdrawing may give the possibility to see things from a different perspective while gaining time and collecting further information, and specially is a low stress approach particularly when the conflict is a short time one. However, not acting may be interpreted as an agreement and therefore it may lead to weakening or losing a previously gained position with one or more parties involved. Furthermore, when using withdrawing as a strategy more time, skills and experiences together with other actions may need to be implemented.

=== Smoothing ===
Smoothing is accommodating the concerns of others first of all, rather than one's own concerns. This kind of strategy may be applied when the issue of the conflict is much more important for the counterparts whereas for the other is not particularly relevant. It may be also applied when someone accepts that he/she is wrong and furthermore there are no other possible options than continuing an unworthy competing-pushing situation. Just as withdrawing, smoothing may be an option to find at least a temporal solution or obtain more time and information, however, it is not an option when priority interests are at stake.

There is a high risk of being abused when choosing the smoothing option. Therefore, it is important to keep the right balance and to not give up one own interests and necessities. Otherwise, confidence in one's ability, mainly with an aggressive opponent, may be seriously damaged, together with credibility by the other parties involved. Needed to say, in these cases a transition to a Win-Win solution in the future becomes particularly more difficult when someone.

== Between organizations ==
Relationships between organizations, such as strategic alliances, buyer-supplier partnerships, organizational networks, or joint ventures are prone to conflict. Conflict resolution in inter-organizational relationships has attracted the attention of business and management scholars. They have related the forms of conflict (e.g., integrity-based vs. competence-based conflict) to the mode of conflict resolution and the negotiation and repair approaches used by organizations. They have also observed the role of important moderating factors such as the type of contractual arrangement, the level of trust between organizations, or the type of power asymmetry.

=== Conflict management ===
Conflict management refers to the long-term management of intractable conflicts. It is the label for the variety of ways by which people handle grievances—standing up for what they consider to be right and against what they consider to be wrong. Those ways include such diverse phenomena as gossip, ridicule, lynching, terrorism, warfare, feuding, genocide, law, mediation, and avoidance. Which forms of conflict management will be used in any given situation can be somewhat predicted and explained by the social structure—or social geometry—of the case.

Conflict management is often considered to be distinct from conflict resolution. In order for actual conflict to occur, there should be an expression of exclusive patterns which explain why and how the conflict was expressed the way it was. Conflict is often connected to a previous issue. Resolution refers to resolving a dispute to the approval of one or both parties, whereas management is concerned with an ongoing process that may never have a resolution. Neither is considered the same as conflict transformation, which seeks to reframe the positions of the conflict parties.

=== Counseling ===
When personal conflict leads to frustration and loss of efficiency, counseling may prove helpful. Although few organizations can afford to have professional counselors on staff, given some training, managers may be able to perform this function. Nondirective counseling, or "listening with understanding", is little more than being a good listener—something often considered to be important in a manager.

Sometimes simply being able to express one's feelings to a concerned and understanding listener is enough to relieve frustration and make it possible for an individual to advance to a problem-solving frame of mind. The nondirective approach is one effective way for managers to deal with frustrated subordinates and coworkers.

There are other, more direct and more diagnostic, methods that could be used in appropriate circumstances. However, the great strength of the nondirective approach (Note: Nondirective counseling is based on the client-centered therapy of Carl Rogers.) lies in its simplicity, its effectiveness, and that it deliberately avoids the manager-counselor's diagnosing and interpreting emotional problems, which would call for special psychological training. Listening to staff with sympathy and understanding is unlikely to escalate the problem, and is a widely used approach for helping people cope with problems that interfere with their effectiveness in the workplace.

== History ==
The modern field of conflict resolution developed during the mid 20^{th} century, and it was shaped by scholars and practitioners who searched for alternatives to traditional power-based diplomacy. For example, within the context of war, the study of territorial conflict resolution has been thoroughly examined.

=== Territoriality ===
According to conflict database Uppsala Conflict Data Program's definition, war may occur between parties who contest an incompatibility. The nature of an incompatibility can be territorial or governmental, but a warring party must be a "government of a state or any opposition organization or alliance of organizations that uses armed force to promote its position in the incompatibility in an intrastate or an interstate armed conflict". Wars can conclude with a peace agreement, which is a "formal agreement... which addresses the disputed incompatibility, either by settling all or part of it, or by clearly outlining a process for how [...] to regulate the incompatibility."

A ceasefire is another form of agreement made by warring parties; unlike a peace agreement, it only "regulates the conflict behaviour of warring parties", and does not resolve the issue that brought the parties to war in the first place.

Peacekeeping measures may be deployed to avoid violence in solving such incompatibilities. Beginning in the last century, political theorists have been developing the theory of a global peace system that relies upon broad social and political measures to avoid war in the interest of achieving world peace. The Blue Peace approach developed by Strategic Foresight Group facilitates cooperation between countries over shared water resources, thus reducing the risk of war and enabling sustainable development.

The escalating costs of conflict have increased use of third parties who may serve as a conflict specialists to resolve conflicts. In fact, relief and development organizations have added peace-building specialists to their teams. Many major international non-governmental organizations have seen a growing need to hire practitioners trained in conflict analysis and resolution. Furthermore, this expansion has resulted in the need for conflict resolution practitioners to work in a variety of settings such as in businesses, court systems, government agencies, nonprofit organizations, and educational institutions throughout the world. Democracy has a positive influence on conflict resolution.

Historian Louis Kriesberg explains that early work emphasized understanding conflict as a dynamic social process rather than a static event. Following this idea, researchers encouraged the systematic study of escalation, de-escalation, and non-violent intervention strategies. After World War II, interdisciplinary research among psychology, sociology, and political science helped establish conflict resolution as a distinct field of study. Peace research centers like the International Center for Peace and Development were established due to the development of this field. For example, cultural issues are complex and require a nuanced understanding of conflict resolution models with the goal being one that results in mutually beneficial solutions.

=== Cultural issues ===
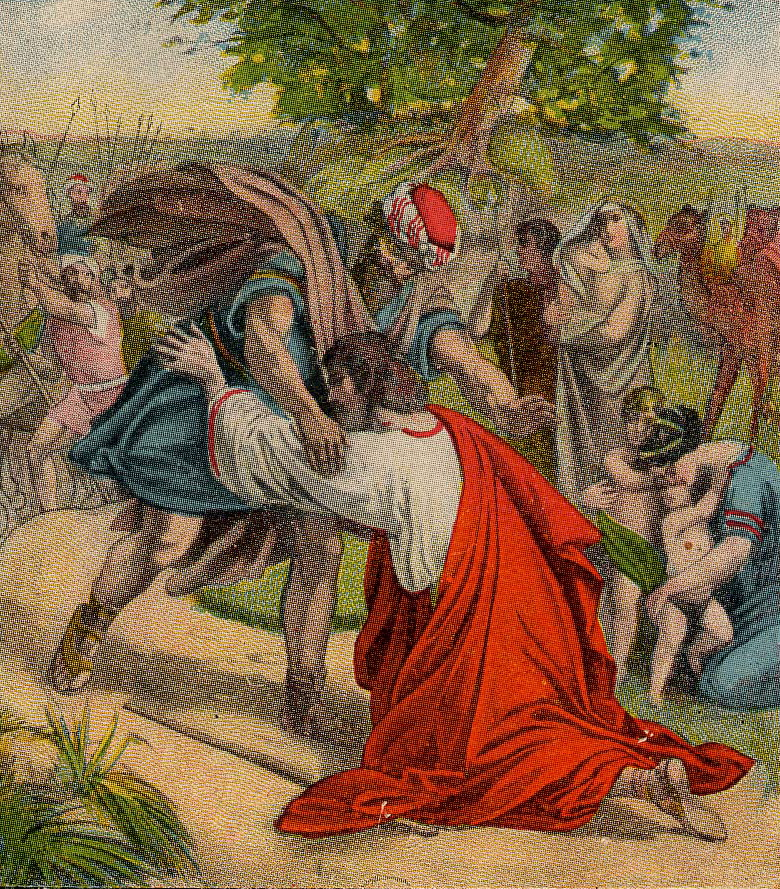
The Reconciliation of Jacob and Esau (illustration from a Bible card published 1907 by the Providence Lithograph Company)

Conflict resolution as both a professional practice and academic field is highly sensitive to cultural practices. In Western cultural contexts, such as Canada and the United States, successful conflict resolution usually involves fostering communication among disputants, problem solving, and drafting agreements that meet underlying needs. In these situations, conflict resolvers often talk about finding a mutually satisfying ("win-win") solution for everyone involved.

In many non-Western cultural contexts, such as Afghanistan, Vietnam, and China, it is also important to find "win-win" solutions; however, the routes taken to find them may be very different. In these contexts, direct communication between disputants that explicitly addresses the issues at stake in the conflict can be perceived as very rude, making the conflict worse and delaying resolution. It can make sense to involve religious, tribal, or community leaders; communicate difficult truths through a third party; or make suggestions through stories. Intercultural conflicts are often the most difficult to resolve because the expectations of the disputants can be very different, and there is much occasion for misunderstanding.

The field of conflict resolution continues to evolve with new models and intervention theories like the "4-sides" or "the circle of conflict" model helping resolve conflicts, from sibling altercations disputes to global disputes.

== In animals ==
Conflict resolution has also been studied in non-humans, including dogs, cats, monkeys, snakes, elephants, and primates. Aggression is more common among relatives and within a group than between groups. Instead of creating distance between the individuals, primates tend to be more intimate in the period after an aggressive incident. These intimacies consist of grooming and various forms of body contact. Stress responses, including increased heart rates, usually decrease after these reconciliatory signals. Different types of primates, as well as many other species who live in groups, display different types of conciliatory behavior. Resolving conflicts that threaten the interaction between individuals in a group is necessary for survival, giving it a strong evolutionary value. A further focus of this is among species that have stable social units, individual relationships, and the potential for intragroup aggression that may disrupt beneficial relationships. The role of these reunions in negotiating relationships is examined along with the susceptibility of these relationships to partner value asymmetries and biological market effects. These findings contradict previous existing theories about the general function of aggression, i.e. creating space between individuals (first proposed by Konrad Lorenz), which seems to be more the case in conflicts between groups than it is within groups.

In addition to research in primates, biologists are beginning to explore reconciliation in other animals. Until recently, the literature dealing with reconciliation in non-primates has consisted of anecdotal observations and very little quantitative data. Although peaceful post-conflict behavior had been documented going back to the 1960s, it was not until 1993 that Rowell made the first explicit mention of reconciliation in feral sheep. Reconciliation has since been documented in spotted hyenas, lions, bottlenose dolphins, dwarf mongoose, domestic goats, domestic dogs, and, recently, in red-necked wallabies.

== See also ==
- Appeasement
- Civil resistance
- Conflict continuum
- Conflict early warning
- Conflict management
- Conflict style inventory
- Cost of conflict
- Countering violent extremism
- Deradicalization
- Deterrence
- Dialectic
- Dialogue
- Dispute resolution
- Fair fighting
- Family therapy
- Gunnysacking
- Incitement
- Interpersonal communication
- Nonviolent Communication
- Perceptual defense
- Reconciliation studies
- Truth-seeking

=== Organizations ===
- Center for the Study of Genocide, Conflict Resolution, and Human Rights
- Conscience: Taxes for Peace not War is a London organisation that promotes peacebuilding as an alternative to military security
- Crisis Management Initiative (CMI)
- Heidelberg Institute for International Conflict Research
- Peninsula Conflict Resolution Center
- Jimmy and Rosalynn Carter School for Peace and Conflict Resolution
- Search for Common Ground is one of the world's largest non-government organisations dedicated to conflict resolution
- Seeds of Peace develops and empowers young leaders from regions of conflict to work towards peace through coexistence
- United Network of Young Peacebuilders (UNOY) is a global non-governmental organization and youth network dedicated to the role of youth in peacebuilding and conflict resolution
- University for Peace is a United Nations mandated organization and graduate school dedicated to conflict resolution and peace studies
- Uppsala Conflict Data Program is an academic data collection project that provides descriptions of political violence and conflict resolution

== Works cited ==
- Bannon, I. & Paul Collier (Eds.). (2003). Natural resources and violent conflict: Options and actions. The World Bank.
- Ury, F. & Rodger Fisher. (1981). Getting to yes: Negotiating agreement without giving in. Penguin.
- Wilmot, W. & Jouyce Hocker. (2007). Interpersonal conflict. McGraw-Hill.
- Bercovitch, Jacob and Jackson, Richard. 2009. Conflict Resolution in the Twenty-first Century: Principles, Methods, and Approaches. University of Michigan Press, Ann Arbor.
- de Waal, Frans B. M. and Angeline van Roosmalen. 1979. Reconciliation and consolation among chimpanzees. Behavioral Ecology and Sociobiology 5: 55–66.
- de Waal, Frans B. M. 1989. Peacemaking Among Primates. Harvard University Press.
- Judge, Peter G.; de Waal, Frans B.M. (1993). "Conflict avoidance among rhesus monkeys: coping with short-term crowding". Animal Behaviour. 46 (2): 221–232. Bibcode:1993AnBeh..46..221J. doi:10.1006/anbe.1993.1184. S2CID 53175846.
- Veenema, Hans; et al. (1994). "Methodological improvements for the study of reconciliation". Behavioural Processes. 31 (1): 29–38. Bibcode:1994BehPr..31...29V. doi:10.1016/0376-6357(94)90035-3. PMID 24897415. S2CID 25126127.
- de Waal, Frans B. M. and Filippo Aureli. 1996. Consolation, reconciliation, and a possible cognitive difference between macaques and chimpanzees. Reaching into thought: The minds of the great apes (Eds. Anne E. Russon, Kim A. Bard, Sue Taylor Parker), Cambridge University Press, New York, NY: 80–110.
- Aureli, Filippo (1997). "Post-conflict anxiety in non-human primates: the mediating role of emotion in conflict resolution". Aggressive Behavior. 23 (5): 315–328. doi:10.1002/(sici)1098-2337(1997)23:5<315::aid-ab2>3.0.co;2-h.
- Castles, Duncan L.; Whiten, Andrew (1998). "Post-conflict behaviour of wild olive baboons, I. Reconciliation, redirection, and consolation". Ethology. 104 (2): 126–147. Bibcode:1998Ethol.104..126C. doi:10.1111/j.1439-0310.1998.tb00057.x.
- Aureli, Filippo and Frans B. M. de Waal, eds. 2000. Natural Conflict Resolution. University of California Press.
- de Waal, Frans B. M. 2000. Primates––A natural heritage of conflict resolution. Science 289: 586–590.
- Hicks, Donna. 2011. Dignity: The Essential Role It Plays in Resolving Conflict. Yale University Press
- Silk, Joan B. (2002). "The form and function of reconciliation in primates". Annual Review of Anthropology. 31 (1): 21–44. Bibcode:2002ARAnt..31...21S. doi:10.1146/annurev.anthro.31.032902.101743.
- Weaver, Ann; de Waal, Frans B. M. (2003). "The mother-offspring relationship as a template in social development: reconciliation in captive brown capuchins (Cebus apella)". Journal of Comparative Psychology. 117 (1): 101–110. doi:10.1037/0735-7036.117.1.101. PMID 12735370. S2CID 9632420.
- Palagi, Elisabetta; et al. (2004). "Reconciliation and consolation in captive bonobos (Pan paniscus)". American Journal of Primatology. 62 (1): 15–30. doi:10.1002/ajp.20000. PMID 14752810. S2CID 22452710.
- Palagi, Elisabetta; et al. (2005). "Aggression and reconciliation in two captive groups of Lemur catta". International Journal of Primatology. 26 (2): 279–294. doi:10.1007/s10764-005-2925-x. S2CID 22639928.
- Bar-Siman-Tov, Yaacov (Ed.) (2004). From Conflict Resolution to Reconciliation. Oxford University Press

== Further readings ==
- Coleman, Peter T. (2011). The Five Percent: Finding Solutions to Seemingly Impossible Conflicts. PublicAffairs. ISBN 978-1-58648-921-2.
- Staniland, Paul (2021). Ordering Violence: Explaining Armed Group-state Relations from Conflict to Cooperation. Cornell University Press. ISBN 978-1-5017-6110-2.
