= I-message =

Assertion about the feelings, beliefs, values etc. of the person speaking

An I-message or I-statement is a form of interpersonal communication in which speakers express their feelings, beliefs, or values from the first-person perspective, usually beginning with I. It contrasted with "you-message" or "you-statement", which often begins with you and focuses on the listener, usually carrying accusatory language.

This term was coined in the 1960s by Thomas Gordon who discussed the concept in his book, P.E.T.: Parent Effectiveness Training (1970). Some sentences that begin with I are not I-messages because the speakers are expressing their perceptions, observations, assumptions, or criticisms (e.g. "I feel you are being defensive").

I-messages are often used to be assertive without putting the listener on the defensive by avoiding accusations. For example, saying "I really am getting backed up on my work since I don't have the financial report yet" makes people feel better than "you didn't finish the financial report on time!".

According to the Conflict Resolution Network, I-messages can also be used in constructive criticism because they allow speakers to express concerns without increasing tension.

== I-message construction ==
While the underlying rationale and approach to I-messages is similar in various systems, there are both three-part and four-part models for constructing I-messages.

The simplest form, as frequently taught, is a single two-part sentence:

1. When you... (objective event; 1st event),
2. I feel... (subjective feeling; 2nd event).

It should be cautioned that "when you..." should be based on an objective event and avoid claims regarding intent. "When you said my birthday was in the wrong month, I felt like you don't care about me," is preferred over, "When you act like you don't care about me and my birthday..." This allows people talking to focus on events and feelings as separate events, which both allows people to express their feelings more clearly and helps clarify the initial event and reach agreement between parties.

A three-part model is proposed by the University of Tennessee Family & Consumer Sciences for improving communication with children:

1. I feel... (Insert feeling word)
2. when... (tell what caused the feeling).
3. I would like... (tell what you want to happen instead).

According to Hope E. Morrow, a common pitfall in I-statement construction is using phrases like "I feel that..." or "I like that..." which typically express an opinion or judgment, such as "I feel that you don't care" or "I feel that you don't do your fair share of the work". Morrow favors following "I feel..." with a feeling such as "sad", "angry", etc.

Gordon advises that to use an I-message successfully, there should be congruence between the words one is using and one's affect, tone of voice, facial expression and body language. Gordon also describes a 3-part I-message, called a "confrontive" I-message, with the following parts:

- non-blameful description of the listener's behavior
- the effect of that behavior on the speaker
- the speaker's feelings about that effect

He describes the I-message as an appeal for help from the other person, and states that the other person is more likely to respond positively when the message is presented in that way.

=== Conflict resolution ===
When an "I" message contains "you-messages", conflict situations can be harder to address. For example: "I feel..., when you..., and I want you to..." This can put the receiver of the statement on the defensive. In a dispute, use of a phrase that begins with "I want" may encourage the parties to engage in positional problem solving. Positional problem solving is stating the outcome that the person wants, rather than the reason the person wants the problem solved. For example, "I want you to take out the trash every night" is positional problem solving, and "I don't want the kitchen to smell bad" is the reason. Declaring a single acceptable solution at the start makes many conflicts more difficult to resolve.

An "interest-based" approach to conflict resolution suggests using statements that reflect why the individual wants something.

The goals of an "I" message in an interest-based approach:

- to avoid using "you" statements that will escalate the conflict
- to respond in a way that will de-escalate the conflict
- to identify feelings
- to identify behaviors that are causing the conflict
- to help individuals resolve the present conflict and/or prevent future conflicts.

The Ohio Commission on Dispute Resolution and Conflict Management summarized this approach as follows: "A sender of a message can use a statement that begins with 'I' and expresses the sender's feelings, identifies the unwanted behavior, and indicates a willingness to resolve the dispute, without using 'you' statements or engaging in positional problem solving".

The Commission proposed a four-part I-message:

1. "I feel ___ (taking responsibility for one's own feelings)
2. "I don't like it when__ " (stating the behavior that is a problem)
3. "because____" (what it is about the behavior or its consequences that one objects to)
4. "Can we work this out together?" (be open to working on the problem together).

Marital stability and relationship analysis researcher John Gottman notes that although I-statements are less likely than You-statements to be critical and to make the listener defensive, "you can also buck this general rule and come up with 'I' statements like 'I think you are selfish' that are hardly gentle. So the point is not to start talking to your spouse in some stilted psychobabble. Just keep in mind that if your words focus on how you're feeling rather than on accusing your spouse, your discussion will be far more successful."

=== Shifting gears ===
Thomas Gordon writes, "Although I-messages are more likely to influence others to change than You-messages, still it is a fact that being confronted with the prospect of having to change is often disturbing to the changee." A quick shift by the sender of the I-message to an active listening posture can achieve several important functions in this situation, according to Gordon. He states that in Leader Effectiveness Training courses, this is called "shifting gears", and states that the person might shift back to an I-message later in the conversation.

== Use of the concept ==
In his book about mentoring, Gordon F. Shea states that communications specialists find that I-messages are a less threatening way to confront someone one wants to influence, and suggests a three-part I-message: a neutral description of planned behaviour, consequences of the behaviour, and the emotions of the speaker about the situation.

Carol M. Davis' manual for health care workers calls I-messages an "important skill", but emphasizes that use of an I-message does not guarantee that the other person will respond in a helpful way. It presents an I-message as a way that one can take responsibility for one's own feelings and express them without blaming someone else. Sheafor, Horejsi, and Horejsi's manual for social workers presents I-messages as a technique with the purpose of improving the effectiveness of communication.

== Emotional reactions ==
A study in Hong Kong of children's reactions to messages from their mothers found that children are most receptive to I-messages that reveal distress, and most antagonistic towards critical you-messages. A study with university students as subjects did not find differences in emotional reactions to I-messages and you-messages for negative emotions, but did find differences in reactions for positive emotions.

A study of self-reported emotional reactions to I-statements and you-statements by adolescents found that accusatory you-statements evoked greater anger and a greater inclination for antagonistic response than assertive I-statements.

== See also ==
- Conflict resolution
- Face saving
- Flaming (Internet)
- Nonviolent Communication
- Passive aggression
- Passivity
