= Global peace system =

Global Peace System is a concept of global conflict resolution dependent on nonviolent processes to eradicate war. It relies upon a multi-strand approach to conflict resolution, incorporating broad social and political solutions. In contemporary peace and conflict studies, the concept of a global peace system has been evolving since the 1940s around the theory that there is a global infrastructure of peacebuilding and that there is a need for systems thinking in peacebuilding. The term "global peace system" was coined from the work of Robert Johansen, who explored the concept in 1978's Toward a Dependable Place.

== Origins and evolution ==
An early use of the term "peace system" occurred in Kirby Page's book National Defense (1931). In a 1943 pamphlet and a 1966 book, political theorist David Mitrany stated that the prevention of wars required the creation of a peace system which he outlined. In 1978's Toward a Dependable Place, Johansen coined the term "global peace system", arguing that, contrary to the advocated and perceived military security in the international system, the peace system provides greater justice, economic well-being and ecological security. In a global peace system, according to Johansen, "conflict is resolved through nonviolent, political, social, and judicial processes. There are no expectations of war and no national military arsenals." Johansen called for the creation of such a system by a people’s movement.

In 1988, Robert A. Irwin stated that a peace system involves multiple war prevention layers: first, global reforms which reduce the causes of war involve non-threatening defense-policies as well as political, economic, ecological and cultural change; second, conflict resolution mechanisms on the local, regional, national and global level.

In 1991, Louise Diamond and John W. McDonald authored Multi-track Diplomacy: a Systems Approach to Peace, wherein they identified nine specific tracks to produce a synergy in peacebuilding: public opinion and communication, government, professional conflict resolution, business, private citizens, activism, religion, funding, and research, training and education. In 1992, the pair founded the United States-based non-profit organization Institute for Multi-track Diplomacy with the mission of putting into practice their systems-based approach to peacebuilding.

In 2003's Instead of War: the Urgency and Promise of the Global Peace System, Timothy McElwee emphasizes three major focal areas in the construction of a global peace system: (1) strengthening international norms and institutions against war; (2) eliminating the conditions that give rise to war and violence; (3) supporting and encouraging alternative means of international conflict transformation. Other sector-based approaches to peacebuilding link international development, humanitarian assistance, gender, the private sector, religion, environmental change, security, media, health and the rule of law.

Referring to the global peace system, Kent Shifferd argues that most of what needs to be invented to end war has been invented. Rob Ricigliano in 2012 stated that "while...difficult to ascribe specific causation to any one group, the positive trends … indicate that the international community, practitioners, and academics have learned important lessons about ending wars and building peace.”

Writing in 2013, Douglas Fry noted that the creation of a global peace system involves synergistic elements such as a transformative vision that a peace-based global system is possible, the understanding of interdependence and cooperation, an added level of social identity including all human beings, the creation of effective and democratic procedures of international adjudication, and peace-supporting symbols and values.

Beginning in 2003, peace ethologist Judith Hand approached the subject of a paradigm shift to a global peace system from biological, behavioral, anthropological, and gender perspectives. Based on the biological principles of sexual dimorphism and parental investment theory and the political principle of gender parity in government (which she termed koinoniarchy) she argued that gender parity in governing is a necessary condition, not an option, for establishment and maintenance of a global peace system.

== See also ==
- World Peace
- Human Rights
- Peace movement
- International security
- Peace and conflict studies
