= Systematic Training for Effective Parenting =

Systematic Training for Effective Parenting (STEP) is a parent education program published as a series of books.

== Overview ==
STEP was developed and published by the psychologists Don Dinkmeyer Sr., Gary D. McKay and Don Dinkmeyer Jr. The publication was supplemented by an extensive concept for training and proliferation. STEP has reached more than 4 million parents and has been translated into Spanish, French, German, and Japanese. Korean and Chinese adaptations are in progress.

== Impact ==
STEP is based on Alfred Adler's individual psychology and the work of the psychologists Rudolf Dreikurs and Thomas Gordon.

An evaluation of the program found that parents who participated in Systematic Training for Effective Parenting (STEP) had more positive perceptions of their children and were less likely to abuse them.
