= Parent Effectiveness Training =

Parent Effectiveness Training (P.E.T.) is a parent education program based on the Gordon Model by Thomas Gordon. Gordon taught the first P.E.T. course in 1962 and the courses proved to be so popular with parents that he began training instructors throughout the United States to teach it in their communities. Over the next several years, the course spread to all 50 states. On November 1, 1970, Gordon wrote the Parent Effectiveness Training (P.E.T.) book. It became a best-seller and was updated in 2000 revised book.

Central to P.E.T. philosophy is how parents can raise children without the use of punitive discipline, which is damaging to the parent, the child, and their relationship. Instead, Gordon advocated a no-lose method of resolving conflicts in which both the parent and the child get their needs met.

Gordon's model upon which the P.E.T. course is based, is a set of concepts and skills for more democratic, collaborative relationships. Core skills are active listening, I-messages, "shifting gears" and "no-lose conflict resolution'. Knowing when to use each skill is facilitated by the Behavior Window, which strives for clarity on "whose problem is this?" Identifying "who owns the problem" is promoted as a big first step in successfully resolving interpersonal conflict.

Gordon Training International, the organization that Gordon founded, has a network of P.E.T. representatives and instructors in 53 countries (as of 2020) who make the course available to the parents of all cultural, racial and religious backgrounds.

== Active listening ==
Active listening is a way of reflecting back what the other person has said to let them know that you're listening and to check your understanding of what they mean. It is a restatement of the other person's total communication: the words of the message plus the accompanying feelings.

== I-messages ==
There are several types of I-messages, all of which communicate information about the self. When dealing with a problem in which the parent owns the problem, use of confrontive I-messages is encouraged. These messages should include the behavior that is causing a problem, the effect on the parent, and how the parent feels about the situation. I-messages should include as little judgment as possible. For instance, instead of saying "you are being rude and inconsiderate" the parent would say something like "I don't like it when you talk this loud during the news because I can't hear it."

== No-lose conflict resolution ==
No-lose conflict resolution is based on John Dewey's six steps to creative solutions for conflicts. The goal is to find a solution that is acceptable to both people involved in the conflict. No one loses, both win.

== Behavior window ==
The Behavior Window is a visual diagram used to determine who owns the problem when one occurs in a relationship. The window is divided into four parts: Child Owns the Problem, No Problem Area, Parent Owns the Problem, Both Own the Problem. Depending on who has the problem, the Gordon Model offers specific communication and conflict resolution skills for resolving it successfully.
