= Fair fighting =

Fair fighting is a conflict resolution process, with the aim of improving marital communication. Fair fighting is a set of rules designed to help couples discuss their differences within boundaries, and in this way preserving the relationship over the need to "win over" the other. Fair fighting is a method for spouses to effectively communicate their respective needs to each other through the use of problem-solving skills. Disciplines involved are psychology, marital and family therapy, and conflict resolution.

== Definition ==
Fair fighting is a respectful, structured way of confronting each other on issues that are causing open or hidden conflict. It is a method for handling and resolving the differences of opinion that inevitably occur between spouses or partners. The basic idea is to provide an alternative to “dirty fighting” which uses reciprocal blaming, yelling, accusing and humiliating the other, in order to win or be “right.” It provides a way to support an individual's point of view while recognizing his or her partner’s needs.

A structure is defined as: “agreed upon ground rules for handling differences and conflict well.” Very clear rules give couples a road map for getting through discussions. This process is called fair fighting, because allows both sides to express their own needs using a respectful process.

== Background ==
Relationship counselors have discovered that conflict can be a learning opportunity for people who learn to correctly manage it. They propose to establish a good frame of rules to fight fair even before the first serious confrontation appears.

== Core ideas ==
People in intimate relationships instigate conflicts in order to resolve unsatisfied needs. Among Maslow’s hierarchy of needs, marital fighting springs on frustration of needs 2-4: Safety, Belonging; Love, and Self-Esteem. The need for safety refers to the absence or alleviation of anxiety and fear of isolation and rejection. It is a sense of well-being, physical and financial security, and provides a foundation for personal health. The need for belonging and love, when satisfied represents the resolution of the dreaded feelings of loneliness, abandonment, depression, and social anxiety.

Even when a good fight can clear the air and define which needs are claiming for attention, unbridled, applying a zero-sum style of fighting ends up destroying the relationship itself. With the objective of controlling, humiliating or winning over the other, all kinds of negative things are said that are very difficult to retrieve. The results are discouraging, because when repetition of the fight happens, inevitable when it is not resolved at the deep needs level, it will sour the relationship. Fair fighting is designed to deal with issues that bring serious conflict while preserving the relationship.

== Sources ==
- Joyce Hocker-Wilmot, William W. Wilmot (2006) Interpersonal conflict, Iowa: Won C. Brown Com.,
- Tim Downs and Joy Downs, (2003) The Seven Conflicts: Resolving the Most Common Disagreements in Marriage. Chicago, IL: Moody Publishers
- Arthur S. Hough (1991) Let's Have It Out: The Bare-Bones Manual of Fair Fighting (New Release Series)
- George Robert Bach and Peter Wyden (1983) Intimate Enemy: How to Fight Fair in Love and Marriage, Avon Books (Mm);
