= Judith Hand =

American novelist

Judith L. Hand
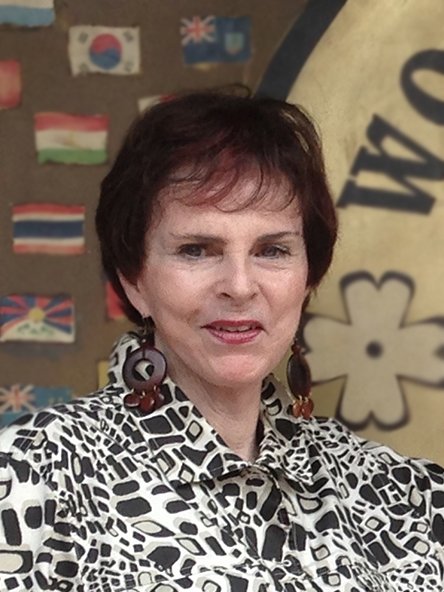
- Born: February 4, 1940 (age 86); Cherokee, Oklahoma, U.S.
- Education: Wheaton College, Wheaton, IL; University of California at Los Angeles
- Occupations: Author (fiction and nonfiction); Ethologist; Futurist
- Writing career
- Subjects: Ethology; Conflict Resolution; War; Peace; Gender Differences in Aggression
- Website: judithhand.net

Judith L. Hand (born February 4, 1940) is an American evolutionary biologist, ethologist and a novelist. She writes on a variety of topics related to the science of animal and human behavior, including the biological and evolutionary roots of war, gender differences in conflict resolution, the empowerment of women, and the steps for ending war.

Her book, Women, Power, and the Biology of Peace is an in-depth exploration of human gender differences with regard to aggression. Her book, Shift:The Beginning of War, The Ending of War is an in-depth exploration of the origins of war, causes of war, human gender differences with regard to war, and possible means to end war. Her website, A Future Without War, a book by the same name, and a paper, To Abolish War, are devoted to the concept of and requirements for abolishing war.

Hand has been a member of the International Society for Human Ethology (ISHE), since its inception in 1972. ISHE is a professional organization whose members study human behavior and come from such diverse disciplines as biology, anthropology and psychology. The term "peace ethology" was coined by ethologist, Peter Verbeek, as a subdiscipline of human ethology, one that is concerned with issues of human conflict, conflict resolution, reconciliation, war, peacemaking, and peacekeeping behavior.

== Research ==
From 1967 to 1975, Hand taught high school biology at Santa Monica High School in Santa Monica, CA. While still teaching, she began a Ph.D. program at UCLA and in 1979 was awarded a Ph.D. in Ethology (her subfields were Ornithology and Primatology). Her doctoral dissertation compared vocalizations of two populations of gulls (Larus occidentalis), and the results were used to reclassify the gull population in the Gulf of California as a separate species, (Larus livens), not just a subspecies of Larus occidentalis.

After completing her doctorate, she continued behavioral research as a Smithsonian Post-doctoral Fellow at the National Zoo in Washington, D.C. (1979–1980). This research resulted in published papers on conflict resolution highlighting the use of egalitarian behavior to resolve conflicts. For example, mated gull pairs in conflict over nesting duties or access to choice food used such methods as sharing, first-come-first-served, and negotiation rather than the commonly studied dominance and subordination behavior to resolve conflicts. Female gulls of the species she studied are always smaller than their mates. In her theoretical paper in the Quarterly Review of Biology (Vol. 61, 1986) she used a game theory approach to introduce the concept of “leverage” to explain why smaller individuals are sometimes able to establish an egalitarian relationship with much larger individuals, ones that could easily dominate them physically. This paper also introduced the concept of “spheres of dominance” to explain why, in a given relationship between two individuals, the relative payoffs to survival or reproduction depends on the context of a conflict. Different contexts will provide different payoffs to each individual and consequently determine which individual of the pair will be dominant in a given context, instead of one individual being dominant over the other in all contexts.

From 1980 to 1985, she was a Research Associate and Lecturer in the UCLA biology department teaching Animal Behavior and Ornithology. In 1987, she moved from Los Angeles to San Diego and spent several years writing fiction.

In 2003, however, she returned to ethology and self-published Women, Power, and the Biology of Peace. The book draws from fields as diverse as evolutionary biology, primatology, behavior, ornithology, cultural anthropology, neurophysiology, and history. Hand has expanded concepts from Women, Power, and the Biology of Peace into essays on her website, A Future Without War.

== Education and work history ==
Hand earned a B.S. degree from Wheaton College, Wheaton, Illinois, in 1961, graduating summa cum laude, having majored in cultural anthropology before switching to zoology. In 1963, she earned an M.A. degree in general physiology at UCLA, after which she briefly worked as a laboratory technician at UCLA's Brain Research Institute. In 1963–1964, Hand was a research technician at the Max Planck Institute for Neuropsychiatry in Munich, Germany, where she assisted in brain surgeries designed to evoke vocalizations in squirrel monkeys; she published her first scientific papers on these behavioral experiments. From 1965 through 1966, at the Pediatrics Department of the UCLA Medical School, she was head technician in a physiological laboratory studying bilirubin metabolism.

== Works ==
After moving from Los Angeles to San Diego in 1987, Hand turned her attention to writing fiction. In 2001, she self-published the novel Voice of the Goddess. In her book Women, Power, and the Biology of Peace, Hand states that she was subsequently drawn back into the subject of war and women while promoting this book. The novel's background is the Minoan Culture which Hand portrays as woman-centered, goddess-worshipping, and without wars of aggression, a view she considers valid but which remains controversial.

In 2004, two of her novels were published by New York publishing houses, the first, an historical epic set against the background of the Trojan War and the second, a contemporary women's action adventure. More published novels soon followed; all featuring strong heroines struggling in epic conflicts in partnership with equally strong heroes.

== Family ==
Judith Leon (née Latta) Hand was born in Cherokee, Oklahoma, the daughter of John Leon Latta & Wanda Hazel Latta (1914–1994). Her father, a successful restaurateur, died when she was nine; her mother, a registered nurse, raised Hand and her younger sister alone. Hand graduated from Torrance High School in Torrance, California, in 1957. In 1967, she married Los Angeles police detective, Harold M. Hand, and remained married to him until his death in 1996. They had no children.

== See also ==
- List of peace activists

== Publications ==
=== Articles ===
- 1966. Winter, Ploog, and Hand. "Vocal repertoire of the Squirrel Monkey (Saimiri sciureus), its analysis and significance." Experimental Brain Research 1: 359–384.
- 1967. Hand, Hopf, and Ploog. "Observations on mating behavior and sexual play in the Squirrel Monkey (Saimiri sciureus)." Primates 8: 229–246.
- 1981. "Sociobiological implications of unusual sexual behaviors of gulls: the genotype/behavioral phenotype problem. Ethology and Sociobiology 2:135-145. 1981.
- 1985. "Egalitarian resolution of social conflicts: a study of pair-bonded gulls in nest duty and feeding contexts." Z. Tierpsychol. 70: 123–147.
- 1986. "Territory defense and associated vocalizations of Western Gulls." J. Field Ornithology 57:1-15.
- 1986. "Resolution of Social Conflicts: Dominance, Egalitarianism, Spheres of Dominance and Game Theory." Quart. Rev. Biol. 61:201-220.
- 1997. Pierotti, Annett, & Hand. "Male and Female Perceptions of Pair-bond Dynamics: Monogamy in the Western Gull, Larus occidentalis." pp. 261–175 in Feminism and Evolutionary Biology: Boundaries, Intersections, and Frontiers, Patricia Adair Gowaty, ed. NY: Chapman and Hall. ISBN 0-943610-45-1.
- 2008. Hand, Judith L. (Review) Beyond War: The Human Potential for Peace by Douglas P. Fry. Human Ethology Bulletin 23(2).
- 2010. Hand, Judith L. "To Abolish War." Journal of Aggression, Conflict, and Peace Research. 2 (4):44-56.
- 2013. Hand, Judith L. (Review) The Moral Molecule: the Source of Love and Prosperity by Paul Zak. Human Ethology Bulletin 28(1).

=== Books ===
==== Nonfiction ====
- 1987 Hand, Southern, & Vermeer (eds.), Ecology and Behavior of Gulls; Studies in Avian Biology, No. 10. ISBN 0-935868-31-3
- 2003 Women, Power, and the Biology of Peace. San Diego, CA: Questpath Publishing. ISBN 0-9700031-6-1
- 2006 A Future Without War: The Strategy of a Warfare Transition. San Diego, CA: Questpath Publishing. ISBN 978-0-9700031-3-3
- 2014 Shift: The Beginning of War, The Ending of War. San Diego, CA: Questpath Publishing. ISBN 978-09700031-8-8
- 2018 War and Sex and Human Destiny. San Diego, CA: Questpath Publishing. ISBN 978-09700031-9-5

==== Fiction ====
- 2001 Voice of the Goddess. Cardiff, CA: Pacific Rim Press. ISBN 0-9700031-3-7
- 2002 Die Gőttin des wűtenden Berges.
- 2004 The Amazon and the Warrior. NY: Tor/Forge. ISBN 0-7653-4936-1
- 2004 Code Name: Dove. NY: Silhouette Books. ISBN 0-373-51318-6
- 2005 Iron Dove. NY: Silhouette Books. ISBN 0-373-51379-8
- 2006 Captive Dove. NY: Silhouette Books. ISBN 0-373-51425-5
- 2007 The Good Thief. NY: Silhouette Books. ISBN 978-0-373-38973-5

== Honors or awards ==
=== Academia ===
- 1966 Student Research Grant, Chapman Fund, National Museum of Natural History, Washington, D.C.
- 1968 Outstanding Student Paper Award, Annual Meeting, American Ornithologists Union.
- 1969 Smithsonian Postdoctoral Fellowship, Smithsonian Institution, Washington, D.C.
- 1984 Elected Member – American Ornithologists Union

=== Selected fiction awards ===
- 1999 Winner, NE Indiana Romance Authors, "Opening Gambit," Historical, "Voice of the Goddess."
- 1999 Winner, Sooner Area Romance Authors, "Shooting Star Award," "Historical, Voice of the Goddess."
- 1999 Winner, San Diego Book Awards, Unpublished Novelists, "Voice of the Goddess."
- 2005 Winner, San Diego Book Awards, Best Historical Novel, "The Amazon and the Warrior."

== Miscellanea ==
- 1982: Chair of the Pacific Seabird Group. During Hand's tenure, the organization gained non-profit status and established an endowment fund.
- 1984: Co-convener of a symposium on the Impact of the 1982-83 El Niño on Seabird Ecology. AAAS Western Division, San Francisco, CA.
- 1987: Article by William Jordan: "Divorce, Sea-gull Style. Sometimes Two Birds Just Can’t See Eye to Eye Over Brooding Privileges." Los Angeles Times Magazine, February 22. Features Dr. Hand's studies on conflict resolution by mated breeding gull pairs.
- 1994: Co-convener of a workshop on Women in Ornithology. Combined meeting of the American Ornithologist's Union, Cooper Ornithological Society, and Wilson Ornithological Society. Missoula, MT.

== Quotes ==
"Because of genetic inclinations that are as deeply rooted as the bonding-for-aggression inclinations of men, most women would prefer to make or keep the peace, the sooner the better." In Women, Power, and the Biology of Peace, p. 45.

"If women around the world in the twenty-first century would get their act together they could, partnered with men of like mind, shift the direction of world history to create a future without war." In A Future Without War: the Strategy of a Warfare Transition, p. 53.
