= Truth sandwich =

Technique in journalism

George Lakoff
(@GeorgeLakoff)
tweeted:

Truth Sandwich:

1. Start with the truth. The first frame gets the advantage.
2. Indicate the lie. Avoid amplifying the specific language if possible.

3. Return to the truth. Always repeat truths more than lies.

December 1, 2018

A truth sandwich is a technique in journalism to cover stories involving misinformation without unintentionally furthering the spread of false or misleading claims. It entails presenting the truth about a subject before covering misinformation, then ending a story by again presenting truth. Margaret Sullivan summarized it as "reality, spin, reality — all in one tasty, democracy-nourishing meal".

The idea was developed by linguist George Lakoff, and the name was coined in June 2018 by Brian Stelter of CNN. Lakoff observed media organizations spreading misinformation by quoting politicians or pundits who lie or mislead. Despite being frequently recommended, there is no empirical evidence supporting its efficacy above and beyond other correction formats.

== Background ==
Lakoff was specifically interested in the ways journalists were covering Donald Trump, who made an unprecedented number of false and misleading statements over the course of his first term as President of the United States. Lakoff has written about Trump's effective use of language and framing techniques, understanding the media will cover and repeat his most controversial statements, stereotypes, and pithy mischaracterization, thus turning even his critics into part of his marketing apparatus. Standard journalistic practice involves repeating claims made by public figures or quoting them directly, but when the public figure is spreading misinformation or disinformation, repetition of the claims can amplify them and increase their harm. Sometimes lies are too consequential to ignore, however, placing journalists in a difficult position.

According to Lakoff, even if you cover a lie and say afterwards that what was just said was false, the message has still been spread, and "denying a frame, activates the frame". He argues that repetition strengthens "frame-circuits" in the brain that we use to understand the world. A truth sandwich ensures the bad information is not the first thing people read or hear, nor the final impression of a story at the end. Restating false claims can reinforce them through repetition, but adding repetition of their fact-checking and rebuttal can have a similar effect.

Lakoff explained his tactic to Brian Stelter on CNN's Reliable Sources podcast on 17 June 2018:

- Lakoff: Right now, people in the media ... allow Trump to manipulate them. So... start with the truth that he's trying to hide. You make clear to that, and then you point out that the president is trying to hide this by lying. You might in... a few words or in a few seconds say a little bit about what the lie is. And go back to the truth.
- Stelter: It's a truth sandwich.
- Lakoff: You've got it. A truth sandwich. Perfect way to image it.

== Reception and adoption ==
=== Use by news media ===
PBS published a blog post that explained the principle behind a truth sandwich is already something its editorial standards address: "Accuracy includes more than simply verifying whether information is correct; facts must be placed in sufficient context based on the nature of the piece to ensure that the public is not misled". Roy Peter Clark wrote for Poynter that the idea of a truth sandwich is like the rhetorical concept of "emphatic word order", where someone places "emphatic words" at the beginning and end of a sentence. In journalism, Clark wrote, "the position of least emphasis turns out to be the middle".

Truth sandwiches have been used, advocated, or discussed in the context of a range of topics where misinformation is particularly widespread. A group of scientists writing about the challenge of misinformation about coronavirus vaccines during the COVID-19 pandemic advocated truth sandwiches as a communication strategy in their guide to dispelling common myths. In an article about truth sandwiches at Journalism.co.uk, Joseph Cummins uses the term "backfire effect" for when "telling people that what they believe in is false [makes] them double down on their beliefs". He urged journalists to utilize the technique, or keep in mind its principles, in not just the main writing about a story involving falsehoods, but also the images, headlines, social media, and other elements of coverage.

== Criticism ==
A critique of the truth sandwich is that there is no evidence demonstrating that it is more effective than other correction formats.. Studies show that presenting the information as a truth sandwich (truth, misinformation, truth) produces similar belief change to a refutation format (misinformation, truth, truth). However, both formats have been found to be more effective than a control condition where no correction is presented.

Crispin Sartwell opined in the Wall Street Journal that using truth sandwiches is manipulative and condescending, and noted that the name is confusing because sandwiches are typically named for what is in the middle, not for the bread.

== See also ==
- Compliment sandwich
- Disinformation and Misinformation
- Factoid
- Illusory truth effect
- Post-truth politics
- Serial-position effect
- Truthiness
