= Parent education program =

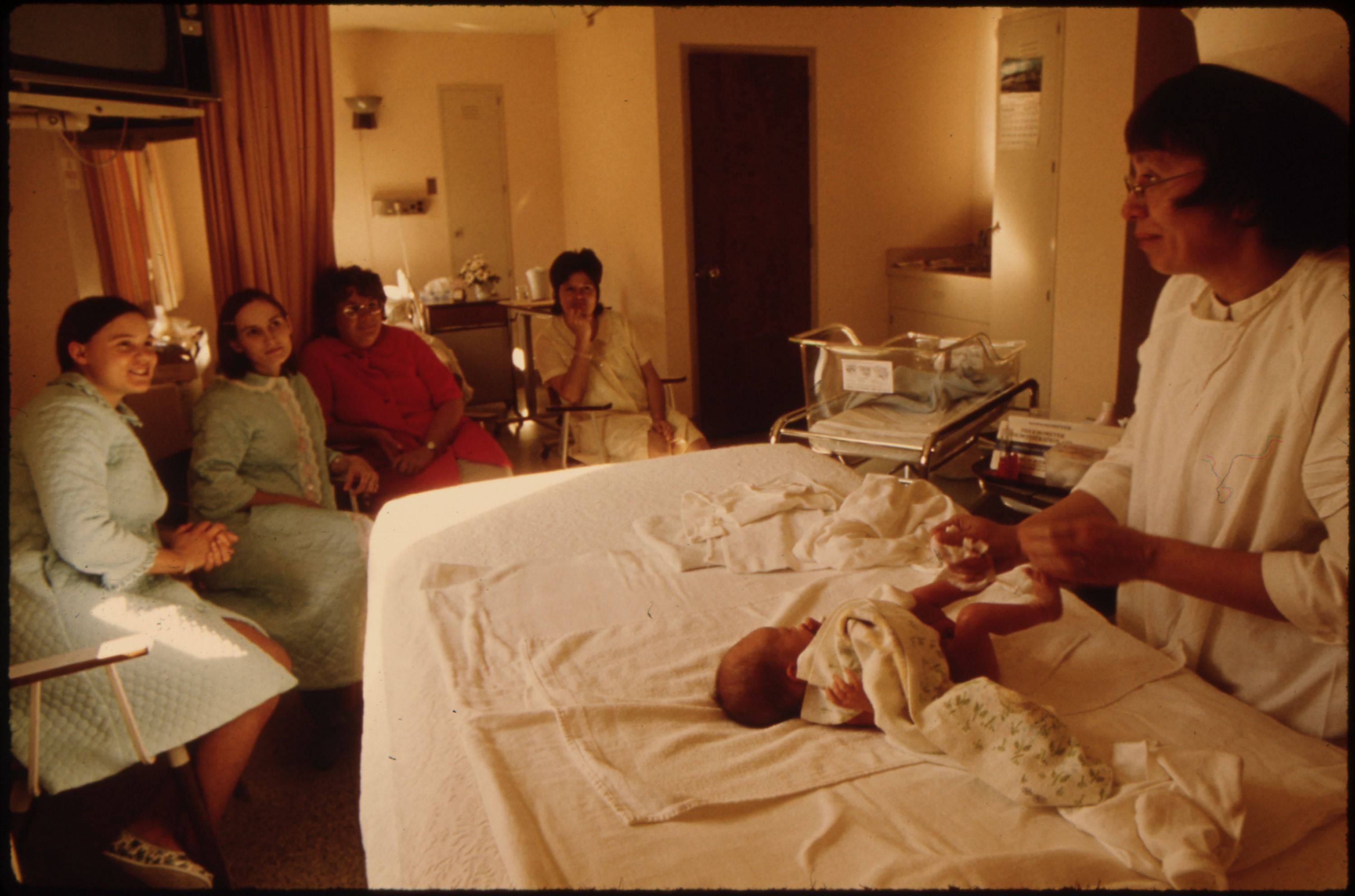
New and expectant parents in a baby care class

A parent education program is a course that can be followed to correct and improve a person's parenting skills. Such courses may be general, covering the most common issues parents may encounter, or specific, for infants, toddlers, children and teenagers. These courses may also be geared towards parents who are considering having a child, or adopting one, or are pregnant.

Some parent education programs are:

- Parent Effectiveness Training is based on person-centered psychotherapy.
- Systematic Training for Effective Parenting (STEP) is based on individual psychology.

== Development ==
Parenting education and support has always existed (e.g. through informal kinship and family networks), but formal recognition of the need to support parents was established through the International Year of the Family in 1994. In understanding the history of parenting programmes, it is necessary to highlight two global shifts. The first relates to significant changes in family structure, where extended, tribal or community family models have given way to more nuclear – and, in some societies, absent-parent – family models (e.g. due to conflict, disease and natural disasters). The second shift involves demands on families due to societal changes in areas including employment, inequity in incomes, exposure to disease and modern influences such as drug use, technology and urbanization. These changes have made clear the need for support for parents or their surrogates. As traditional structures dissipate and new parenting challenges arise, concerted efforts are required to assist parents in fulfilling their role.

== Landscape of parenting programs ==
There are two broad categories of parenting programmes. Parent education and support programmes not only include services that help parents in their role but may also include information on other aspects (e.g. job training or adult literacy). Parenting support programmes are those that are focused primarily on parenting. These two types are differentiated because of their implications for policy and establishing appropriate entry points for service provision. For example, social protection, health care and cash transfer programmes could provide an entry point for parent education and support programmes.

The landscape of parenting programmes is quite complex and can be differentiated on several dimensions that have been associated with child outcomes. The variety and complexity of these services and challenges in the identification of effective parenting models are highlighted below.

Some programmes are intended to improve parents' knowledge and practices related to caregiving, nutrition and child health, while others focus on early education and learning. There are also programmes centred around the reduction of harsh parenting and violence at home, and a range of programmes that have more comprehensive or integrated designs, for example, the Integrated Management of Childhood Illness (IMCI) – Care for Development. There is also a set of programmes in which parenting, although addressed, is not the primary focus (e.g. social protection, cash transfer programmes or adult literacy programmes).

Programmes can also be differentiated by the number of generations who are the target beneficiaries. Single-generation programmes are designed to directly serve mothers (e.g. breastfeeding programmes) and/or fathers, while multi-generational programmes either serve the parent and the child or the entire family.

Programmes may also differ in their targeted stage of development. Some focus on parents with children from birth to 3 years old (Hamadani et al., 2006), but others are designed for parents with children from 3 upwards. Typically, programmes that focus on the younger age group have a health, nutrition and/or stimulation focus and those for older children have a social, learning and education focus.

Programmes also differ based on setting. Some are home-based, some clinic-based, and others community-based.

The type of service provider involved in a programme is also a differentiating dimension. Professional service providers include nurses and trained parent educators. However, given issues of low technical capacity and limited resources, most programmes use paraprofessionals or community workers. Depending on the type of programme, the credentials and training of the service provider and supervision practices are critical to improving its quality.

Another differentiating dimension is the manner in which services are delivered. Some parenting programmes involve a one-to-one teaching or counselling model, while others use a group discussion format. They may use one or multiple delivery mechanisms. For example, a very common combination is home-based services and media in the form of posters and brochures or radio announcements.

Programmes can also be differentiated by the degree of standardization within their curriculum. Some follow a very structured curriculum with weekly lessons plans and a detailed script for the service providers, while others are less formal with topics generated based on participant needs and interests.

Finally, programmes can be distinguished from one another based on the critical dimension of 'dose' which includes the length of the programme from inception to culmination, the periodicity (e.g. daily or weekly) and the length of each session. Programme dosage is important for understanding effectiveness and resource requirements. Also, it has been noted that as programmes get scaled up the dosage is often altered.

This complex landscape of parenting programmes is represented across programmatic models as either single site or demonstration interventions or national programmes supported by specific sectors, such as health, education, women's affairs or welfare.

== Kess-erziehen ==
Alfred Adlers individual psychology and the work of Rudolf Dreikurs are the scientific foundation of kess-erziehen. In German "Kess" means breezy or perky. The abbreviation refers to cooperative, encouraging, social and situation-oriented. The goal of the course is to promote a cooperative, democratic educational style through common rules for family life and consensus that is reached in a family council.

The course promotes the ability of the participants to understand the social needs of children, the disregard of which can lead to undesirable behaviors. Adults and children are seen as equal and the mutual approval of needs is emphasized. Parents and educators learn to develop cooperation, conflict management and to set borders through logical consequences. Consistent, encouraging action is used to promote independence and to allow children to accept responsibility for their own actions.

The participants are guided to act situation-oriented, to offer choices to children and to notice positive behaviors, instead of reacting primarily to undesirable behaviors. Thereby self-esteem and responsible action in partnership are promoted.

== Starke Eltern - Starke Kinder ==
Starke Eltern – Starke Kinder is the parent education course of the German Child Protection Alliance (DKSB). The program is based on humanistic psychology.

The target audience of the program are all parents but adaption to more specific target audiences, as for instance single parents, stepfamilies, certain age groups or educators is possible. The course uses a model of guided education, which allows the parents to try out what they learned at home. The participants are guided to improve the communication between parents and child, to strengthen the self-esteem of the child, to reflect on educational goals and to recognize and solve problems.

== Summary of findings from parenting programs ==
Findings from a recently published review of eleven effectiveness trials and four scaled-up parenting programmes reflect a range in delivery settings, generation of target beneficiaries, curricula and key messages. All programmes report substantial positive outcomes for children (e.g. cognitive, social and emotional development) and two of the programmes report significant improvements in adult parenting knowledge and the home environment. There are also some interesting patterns to the results that have important implications for future programme design. First, the findings suggest that programmes that employ more than one delivery mechanism are more effective than those that rely on a single mechanism, and programmes that address the parent and child (i.e. two-generation programmes) are more effective than those that only focus on the parent. The effects of the evaluated programmes were also stronger among younger children; this result demonstrates support for the hypothesis that earlier intervention yields better outcomes. Also, results were stronger for poorer children when compared with their wealthier peers; this finding validates previous work on programmes impact and disadvantage. A 2016 Cochrane systematic review of group-based parent training programs for improving emotional and behavioral adjustment in young children found tentative support for their short term effectiveness.

Finally, some interventions improve parenting practices even when their primary focus is not parenting. For instance, social protection conditional cash transfer programmes that combine cash and parenting services have demonstrable impact on parenting knowledge and practice. These evaluations, predominantly from Latin America, are important because they address parenting directly through support and education but also indirectly by altering a family's poverty status – a contextual influence on parenting. Adult and family literacy programmes have also demonstrated a positive impact on parent and child outcomes. These results are not unexpected given the established link between maternal education and child health and development outcomes.

In summary, parenting programmes exist within a complex landscape and represent a myriad of designs, making it difficult to isolate and compare effective mechanisms. In addition, the strong influence of context is important in the interpretation of results. In general, these programmes have been effective in improving parenting practices, knowledge and attitudes and in supporting children's positive health, growth, development, learning and protection.

== Broadening the focus to include families ==
It has been speculated that 'parenting' is an academic term to represent the reality, which is 'families'. The suggested shift in approach from parenting to family might be useful in increasing the impact of the interventions. This recommendation stems not only from the shifting definition of who is a parent because of health, demographic and economic changes in society, but also the recognition that the immediate context of a young child consists of several key individuals who constitute a family. Also, 'family' as an institution is recognized across sectors, and, particularly in times of conflict and disaster, is often the only institution that is able to support the child. UNESCO's report contained an important set of approaches that resonate even today, for example with respect to the Millennium Development Goals. The shift will allow for multiple sectors to provide a coordinated focus on the institution of 'family' in a cohesive manner. Family intervention programmes, although primarily from high-income countries, have been very effective in improving well-being in a service and cost-effective manner.

== Sources ==
This article incorporates text from a free content work. Licensed under CC-BY-SA IGO 3.0 (license statement/permission). Text taken from Investing against Evidence: The Global State of Early Childhood Care and Education, 159-164, Marope, P.T.M., Kaga, Y., UNESCO. UNESCO.

== See also ==
- Triple P (parenting program)
- Active Parenting
- SafeCare
- Parent Management Training
- The Incredible Years
- Nurse-Family Partnership
