= Ohio Commission on Dispute Resolution and Conflict Management =

The Ohio Commission on Dispute Resolution and Conflict Management (CDR) was a state agency of Ohio, headquartered on the 24th Floor of the Riffe Center in Columbus. The commission established anti-bullying and truancy prevention programs at Ohio schools.

It was closed in 2009 in statewide budget-cuts and has not been reinstated.
