= Nonviolent Communication =

Communication process intended to increase empathy

Nonviolent Communication (NVC) is a communication process developed by clinical psychologist Marshall Rosenberg based on the principles of nonviolence and humanistic psychology. It aims to increase empathic understanding and reduce conflict in everyday interactions. It foregrounds four components: observation (distinguishing concrete observation from evaluation), feelings, fundamental needs, and requests. It encourages expressing observations and needs without judgment to foster voluntary cooperation.

NVC evolved from concepts used in person-centered therapy. It is both used as a clinical psychotherapy modality and also offered in workshops for the general public, particularly in regard to relationships and the workplace. It can also be applied in daily life to reduce stress. NVC has been the subject of small trials and scoping reviews, however, the evidence base is heterogeneous and reviewers have called for larger, longer and more rigorous studies, and for attention to cultural adaptation and trauma-sensitive implementation.

The United Nations Academic Impact (UNAI) organisation has cited NVC as a means of achieving Article 1 of the UN Charter, i.e. of avoiding war and propagating peace. UNAI believes the UN's Sustainable Development Goals (SDGs) can be achieved more easily by enhancing people's emotional intelligence (EQ). NVC is part of the Inner Development Goals (IDGs) Toolkit. They are intended to bring the power of inner development to global challenges faced by humanity as an invitation to people to be the change they want to see in the world.

NVC is presented in materials such as Rosenberg's book Nonviolent Communication: A Language of Life and a companion workbook. Rosenberg also taught NVC in a number of video lectures available online. NVC materials are available as a podcast on Spotify and on YouTube.

== History ==
=== Origins ===
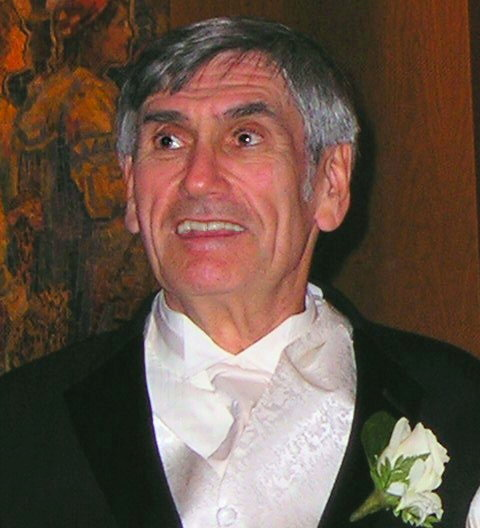
Marshall Rosenberg in 2005

Marshall Rosenberg's motivation for developing NVC was based on his own experiences during the Detroit race riot of 1943, as well as the antisemitism that he experienced in his early life. According to Marion Little (2008), the roots of the NVC model developed in the late 1960s, when Rosenberg was working on racial integration in schools and organizations in the Southern United States. The earliest version of the model (observations, feelings, needs, and action-oriented wants) was part of a training manual Rosenberg prepared in 1972.

=== Influences ===
NVC's development was highly influenced by Carl Rogers' person-centered therapy, particularly the value of congruence, empathic listening, and realness. Rogers emphasized: 1) experiential learning, 2) "frankness about one's emotional state," 3) the satisfaction of hearing others "in a way that resonates for them," 4) the enriching and encouraging experience of "creative, active, sensitive, accurate, empathic listening," 5) the "deep value of congruence between one's own inner experience, one's conscious awareness, and one's communication," and, subsequently, 6) the enlivening experience of unconditionally receiving love or appreciation and extending the same. These influenced the concepts described in the section below.

Rosenberg was influenced by Erich Fromm, George Albee, and George Miller to adopt a community focus in his work, moving away from clinical psychological practice. The central ideas influencing this shift by Rosenberg were that: (1) individual mental health depends on the social structure of a community (Fromm), (2) therapists alone are unable to meet the psychological needs of a community (Albee), and (3) knowledge about human behavior will increase if psychology is freely given to the community (Miller).

=== Early work with children: Giraffe and Jackal ===
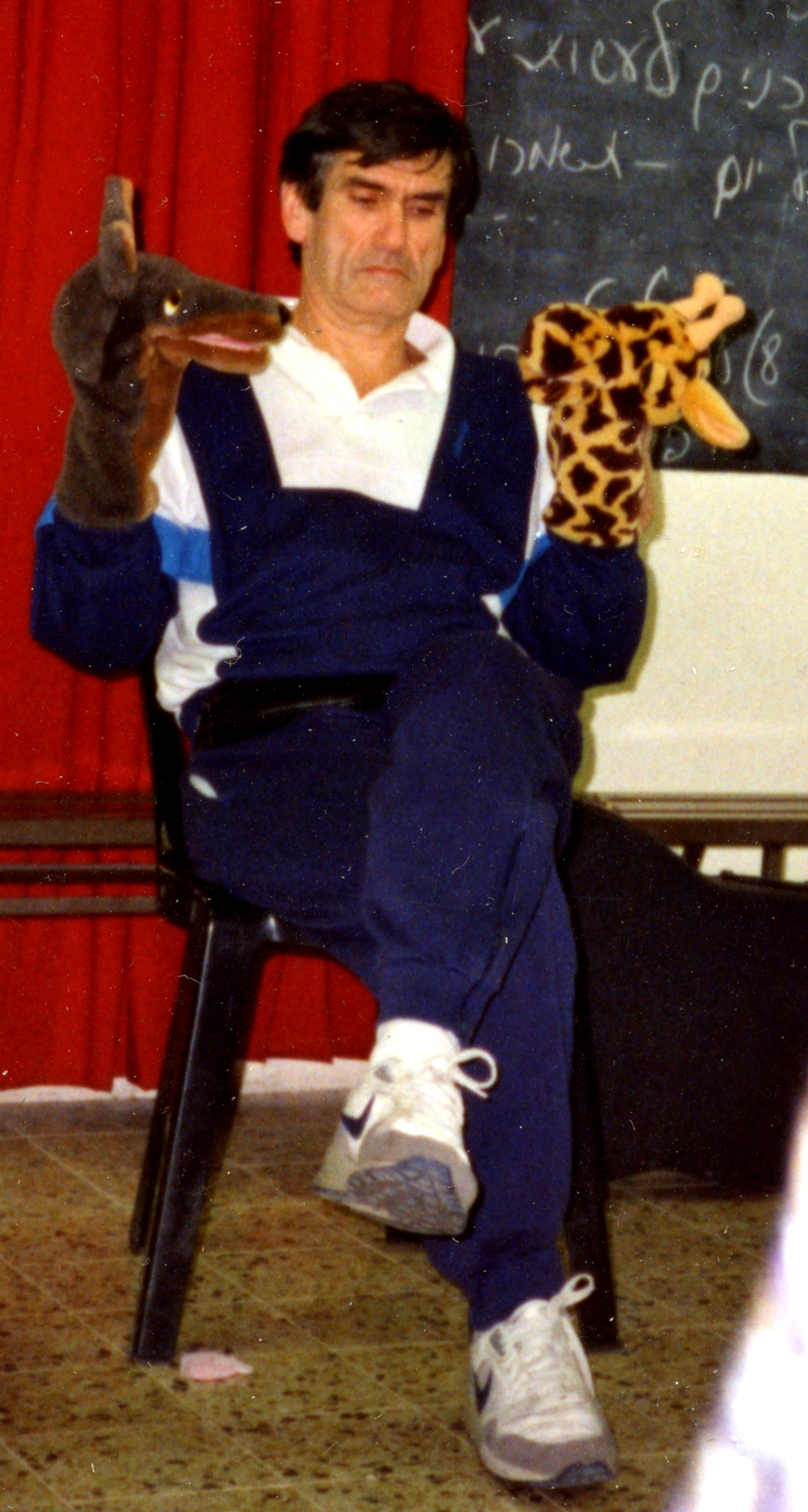
Marshall Rosenberg lecturing in a Nonviolent Communication workshop, 1990

Rosenberg's early work with children with learning disabilities shows his interest in psycholinguistics and the power of language, as well as his emphasis on collaboration. In its initial development, the NVC model re-structured the pupil-teacher relationship to give students greater responsibility for, and decision-making related to, their own learning. The model has evolved over the years to incorporate institutional power relationships (i.e., police-citizen, boss-employee) and informal ones (i.e. man-woman, rich-poor, adult-youth, parent-child). The ultimate aim is to develop societal relationships based on a restorative, "partnership" paradigm and mutual respect, rather than a retributive, fear-based, "domination" paradigm.

In order to show the differences between communication styles, Rosenberg started to use two animals. Violent communication was represented by the carnivorous Jackal as a symbol of aggression and especially dominance. The herbivorous Giraffe on the other hand, represented his NVC strategy. The Giraffe was chosen as symbol for NVC as its long neck is supposed to show the clear-sighted speaker, being aware of his fellow speakers' reactions; and because the Giraffe has a large heart, representing the compassionate side of NVC. In his courses he tended to use these animals in order to make the differences in communication clearer to the audience.

=== Evolution of NVC model ===
The model had evolved to its present form (observations, feelings, needs and requests) by 1992. Since the late 2000s, there has been more emphasis on self-empathy as a key to the model's effectiveness. Another shift in emphasis, since 2000, has been the reference to the model as a process. The focus is thus less on the "steps" themselves and more on the practitioner's intentions in speaking ("Is the intent to get others to do what one wants, or to foster more meaningful relationships and mutual satisfaction?") in listening ("Is the intent to prepare for what one has to say, or to extend heartfelt, respectful attentiveness to another?") and the quality of connection experienced with others.

=== NVC and #MeToo ===
In 2019, a group of certified NVC trainers published a #MeToo statement encouraging all facilitators to share a warning with prospective clients and students about the potential risks of empathy work and recommended sexual boundaries.

== Overview ==
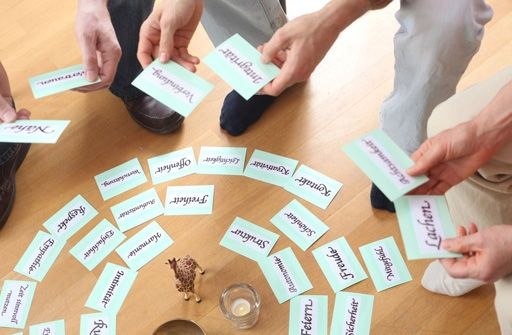
Cards with basic human needs in the hands of exercise group participants.

Nonviolent Communication holds that most conflicts between individuals or groups arise from miscommunication about their human needs, due to coercive or manipulative language that aims to induce fear, guilt, shame, etc. These "violent" modes of communication, when used during a conflict, divert the attention of the participants away from clarifying their needs, their feelings, their perceptions, and their requests, thus perpetuating the conflict.

=== Alternative names ===
In a recorded lecture, Marshall Rosenberg describes the origins of the name Nonviolent Communication. He explains that the name was chosen to connect his work to the word "nonviolence" that was used by the peace movement, thus showing the ambition to create peace on the planet. Meanwhile, Marshall did not like that name since it described what NVC is not, rather than what NVC is. In fact, this goes against an important principle in the fourth component of NVC, i.e. requests. Specifically, in an NVC request, one should ask for what one does want, not what one doesn't want. Because of this, a number of alternative names have become common, most importantly giraffe language, compassionate communication, or collaborative communication.

=== Components ===
There are four components to practice nonviolent communication, and in this order:

1. Observation: these are facts (what we are seeing, hearing, or touching) as distinct from our evaluation of meaning and significance. NVC discourages static generalizations. It is said that "When we combine observation with evaluation, others are apt to hear criticism and resist what we are saying." Instead, a focus on observations specific to time and context is recommended.
2. Feelings: these are emotions or sensations, free of thought and story. They are pure emotional states, explicitly excluding statements which attribute cause or blame. Feelings are to be distinguished from thoughts (e.g., "I feel I didn't get a fair deal") and from words colloquially used as feelings but which convey what we think we are (e.g., "inadequate"), how we think others are evaluating us (e.g., "unimportant"), or what we think others are doing to us (e.g., "misunderstood", "ignored"). Feelings are said to reflect whether we are experiencing our needs as met or unmet. Identifying feelings is said to allow us to more easily connect with one another, and "Allowing ourselves to be vulnerable by expressing our feelings can help resolve conflicts."
3. Needs: these are universal human needs, as distinct from particular strategies for meeting needs. It is posited that "Everything we do is in service of our needs." Marshall Rosenberg refers to Max-Neef's model where needs may be categorised into 9 classes: sustenance, safety, love, understanding/empathy, creativity, recreation, sense of belonging, autonomy and meaning. The Center for Nonviolent Communication provides an extensive inventory of universal human needs.
4. Requests: requests are distinguished from demands in that one is open to hearing a response of "no" without this triggering an attempt to force the matter. If one makes a request and receives a "no" it is not recommended that one gives up, but that one empathizes with what is preventing the other person from saying "yes," before deciding how to continue the conversation. It is recommended that requests use clear, positive, concrete action language.

=== Modes ===
There are three primary modes of application of NVC:

- Self-empathy involves compassionately connecting with what is going on inside us. This may involve, without blame, noticing the thoughts and judgments we are having, noticing our feelings, and most critically, connecting to the needs that are affecting us.
- Receiving empathically in NVC involves "connection with what's alive in the other person and what would make life wonderful for them... It's not an understanding of the head where we just mentally understand what another person says... Empathic connection is an understanding of the heart in which we see the beauty in the other person, the divine energy in the other person, the life that's alive in them... It doesn't mean we have to feel the same feelings as the other person. That's sympathy, when we feel sad that another person is upset. It doesn't mean we have the same feelings; it means we are with the other person... If you're mentally trying to understand the other person, you're not present with them." Empathy involves "emptying the mind and listening with our whole being." NVC suggests that however the other person expresses themselves, we focus on listening for the underlying observations, feelings, needs, and requests. It is suggested that it can be useful to reflect a paraphrase of what another person has said, highlighting the NVC components implicit in their message, such as the feelings and needs you guess they may be expressing.
- Expressing honestly in NVC is likely to involve expressing an observation, feeling, need, and request. An observation may be omitted if the context of the conversation is clear. A feeling might be omitted if there is sufficient connection already, or the context is one where naming a feeling isn't likely to contribute to connection. It is said that naming a need in addition to a feeling makes it less likely that people will think you are making them responsible for your feeling. Similarly, it is said that making a request in addition to naming a need makes it less likely that people will infer a vague demand that they address your need. The components are thought to work together synergistically. According to NVC trainer Bob Wentworth, "an observation sets the context, feelings support connection and getting out of our heads, needs support connection and identify what is important, and a request clarifies what sort of response you might enjoy. Using these components together minimizes the chances of people getting lost in potentially disconnecting speculation about what you want from them and why."

== Research ==
Academic and applied research on Nonviolent Communication (NVC) has expanded since the 1990s across healthcare, education, correctional settings, substance abuse programs, peace communication, ecopedagogy, and sustainable development, among others. Systematic reviews note challenges in verifying its effectiveness, however. While recent studies consistently highlight positive impacts, they also point out methodological limitations, such as small samples and the need for controlled, long-term, multi-site studies.

=== Healthcare ===
A 2024 scoping review synthesized evidence from seven studies and found that NVC training improved interpersonal relationships among healthcare professionals, reduced workplace conflict, and promoted a culture of empathy and cooperation in high-stress environments. It found that, in the stressful environment of healthcare, "Nonviolent Communication is a significant resource for improving interpersonal relationships in healthcare work. This approach can be adopted as a strategy by managers and decision-makers, both to resolve conflicts and to prevent aggressive situations between health professionals." Health sector studies have also suggested that NVC training can mitigate burnout and improve teamwork among doctors and nurses.

A randomized trial by Epinat-Duclos et al. (2021) found that a brief 2.5-day Nonviolent Communication training produced statistically significant increases in self-reported (subjective) empathy at three-month follow-up among 312 third-year French medical students (123 intervention, 189 control). The study used both implicit and explicit empathy measures and described the results as promising while noting the need for larger, longer and more diverse trials to assess durability and clinical impact.

=== Education ===
Recent evaluations in education suggest that NVC fosters prosocial behavior, constructive conflict negotiation, and increased empathy in students and staff. Nonviolent communication has also been recommended for inclusion in the education of seminarians, to prepare them for ministry. Theresa Latini argued that "NVC is one concrete means of living as those made in the image of God in churches and seminaries too often marked by entrenched power struggles and vitriolic discourse."

=== Prisons, parolees, and substance abuse ===
Experimental and mixed-method studies in correctional institutions have shown promising results regarding the use of NVC and mindfulness-based conflict resolution workshops. Freedom Project programs, for example, report reduced interpersonal aggression and improved emotional regulation among participants in US prisons, though these initiatives often lack formal randomized controlled trial evaluation. This 2014 study of 885 male inmates of the Monroe Correctional Complex in Monroe, Washington showed the training reduced recidivism from 37% to 21%, and was estimated to have saved the state $5 million per year in reduced incarceration costs. The training was found to increase equanimity, decrease anger, and lead to abilities to take responsibility for one's feelings, express empathy, and to make requests without imposing demands.

Individual studies focusing on parole and reintegration also find that NVC programs increase empathy and promote peaceful conflict resolution in high-risk populations. Additionally, one 2011 study of men just released from prison found that NVC training not only helped them reintegrate into society but that it could also be helpful in dealing with substance abuse issues. A 2021 study in South Korea on the effects of a nonviolent communication-based training program for inpatient alcoholics also found the NVC training effectively improved participants' empathy, anger management ability, communication skills, and their ability to abstain from alcohol.

=== NVC and peace communication ===
Espiritu (2023) conducted a qualitative meta-analysis of theoretical and empirical studies on Nonviolent Communication (NVC), situating it within a wider framework of peace communication. The study synthesises findings that NVC training has been associated with gains in empathy, conflict resolution and community building across educational, correctional and civic settings, while also highlighting the importance of cultural adaptation and trauma-sensitive pedagogy. The paper proposes a model linking intrapersonal, interpersonal and sociopolitical dimensions of peace and calls for further empirical research to assess the long-term effectiveness of NVC in peace education and activism.

=== NVC and ecopedagogy ===
Most recently, nonviolent communication has been cited alongside ecopedagogy and psychological rewilding as one of the essential tools necessary to 'mend the disconnection between self, society, and Earth.' The authors claim that, in an age of mass extinctions, where the ecosystems that sustain us are breaking down, and amidst epidemics of fear and loneliness, NVC could become part of a "transformative framework for educators, therapists, community leaders, and others seeking to reclaim education as a pathway for planetary healing."

=== NVC and planetary boundaries ===
A 2017 master's thesis by Bonnell, Li and van Lingen, grounded in Rockström et al.'s planetary-boundaries framework that warns humanity has already exceeded several ecological limits, argued that organisations must strengthen their adaptive capacity to help society operate within a safe planetary space. It explored whether Nonviolent Communication (NVC)—a four-step, needs-based communication method—can support this by enhancing five organisational elements of adaptive capacity: diversity, learning, self-organisation, trust and shared meaning.

Using mixed methods (literature review, interviews with certified NVC trainers and organisational representatives, staff survey and follow-up interviews across three Dutch organisations—a school, a non-governmental organisation and a research institute), the study found that NVC improved interpersonal dynamics such as expressing feelings, resolving conflict, giving feedback and teamwork, though effects on ICT use were weaker. The authors concluded that NVC can directly foster trust, diversity and learning, and indirectly strengthen shared meaning and self-organisation, while noting the small, self-selected sample and exploratory design limit generalisability and calling for larger comparative and systems-level studies.

== Limitations ==
Scholars and practitioners have noted limitations of Nonviolent Communication, including a limited and heterogeneous evidence base, cultural assumptions that may require adaptation in non-Western contexts, and challenges in addressing structural power imbalances or trauma without complementary approaches. Commentators also highlight practical constraints, such as time requirements, variability in training quality, and the risk of mechanical or manipulative use, while systematic reviews call for larger, longer-term and cross-cultural studies to assess effectiveness.

=== Evidence base and methodological limits ===
Systematic and scoping reviews note that NVC evaluations are relatively few, heterogeneous in design, often small in sample size, and use varied outcome measures; consequently generalisability is limited and longer-term, larger trials are needed to establish where and for whom NVC is effective.

=== Context, culture and transferability ===
Because NVC grew out of Western therapeutic and facilitation settings, several authors note that its assumptions about verbal expressiveness, individual disclosure and the structure of dialogue may require cultural adaptation when applied in other contexts. In collectivist cultures, where indirect communication is valued, NVC's emphasis on explicit emotional disclosure may be perceived as intrusive.

=== Power, trauma and possible harms ===
When NVC is taught or used as scripted phrases rather than as context-sensitive practice, it may sound inauthentic, be experienced as manipulative, or shift emotional labour onto recipients. Proponents advise trauma-aware facilitation, emphasis on consent, and cultural adaptation. Trauma specialists also warn that empathy-focused communication techniques like NVC, which emphasise the value of being open and vulnerable, do not by themselves address structural power imbalances and may risk re-traumatising vulnerable participants with unresolved trauma. NVC may require additional safeguards for these people, especially in settings with significant power imbalances.

=== Practical constraints and variability in training ===
NVC trainings vary widely in duration and provider quality, affecting outcomes and accessibility. Practitioners also note that NVC-style dialogue can be time-consuming in large or fast-moving settings, limiting its practicality without adapted processes or strong facilitation.

=== Summary and research needs ===
While small-scale and pilot studies report improvements in empathy and communication, reviewers emphasise that the evidence is limited, context-bound and methodologically diverse. The literature calls for larger, longer and cross-cultural trials, and for implementation studies that explicitly test trauma-informed and power-sensitive adaptations.

== Applications ==
NVC has been applied in peace projects, organizational and business settings, in parenting, in education, in mediation, in psychotherapy, in healthcare, in addressing eating issues, in justice, as a basis for a children's book, and in AI apps, among other contexts.

=== NVC in conflict zones ===
Rosenberg related ways he used Nonviolent Communication in peace programs in conflict zones including Rwanda, Burundi, Nigeria, Malaysia, Indonesia, Sri Lanka, Colombia, Serbia, Croatia, Ireland, and the Middle East including the occupied West Bank. NVC has also been used in a peace project in Lebanon.

=== NVC in Microsoft corporate turnaround ===
Reportedly, one of the first acts of Satya Nadella when he became CEO of Microsoft in 2014 was to ask top company executives to read Rosenberg's book, Nonviolent Communication. This was part of a drive to stop infighting and restore morale, and resulted in an increase in the company's value of over $250 billion.

=== NVC and AI ===
Various apps and chatbots are available that help people apply NVC principles in their communications, including text messages and emails, or just for communicating more empathically with themselves. Additionally, human-centered frameworks are being developed for AI-mediated communication that build on the principles of NVC. And generative AI tools like ChatGPT are being used to replace or assist certified human NVC trainers, "to prepare for and review events and workshops, and in the future to support consensus building and cooperative behavior in digital democracy, platform cooperatives, and cyber-human social co-operating systems." Experienced NVC trainers have advised caution, however, in the application of AI for nonviolent communication: "AI is a collection of strategies intended to contribute to needs – possibly efficiency, creativity, security, or stimulation. However, depending on how it is implemented and used, AI could result in needs not met, including belonging, authenticity, connection, presence, and others. ... AI can be a practice partner or support tool for learning empathy, but it can never replace the living energy of human connection."

== Relationship to other models ==
=== Interest-based model ===
Marion Little examines theoretical frameworks related to NVC. The influential interest-based model for conflict resolution, negotiation, and mediation developed by Fisher, Ury, and Patton at the Harvard Negotiation Project and at the Program on Negotiation in the 1980s appears to have some conceptual overlap with NVC, although neither model references the other.

=== Gordon model ===
Little also suggests The Gordon Model for Effective Relationships (1970) as a likely precursor to both NVC and interest-based negotiation, based on conceptual similarities, if not any direct evidence of a connection. Like Rosenberg, Gordon had worked with Carl Rogers, so the models' similarities may reflect common influences.

=== Active listening ===
Suzanne Jones sees a substantive difference between active listening as originated by Gordon and empathic listening as recommended by Rosenberg, insofar as active listening involves a specific step of reflecting what a speaker said to let them know you are listening, whereas empathic listening involves an ongoing process of listening with both heart and mind and being fully present to the other's experience, with an aim of comprehending and empathizing with the needs of the other, the meaning of the experience for that person.

=== Focused Conversation Method (FCM) ===
Martha Lasley sees similarities with the Focused Conversation Method (FCM) developed by the Institute of Cultural Affairs International (ICA), with NVC's observations, feelings, needs, and requests components relating to FCM's objective, reflective, interpretive, and decisional stages.

=== Mindfulness and somatic approaches ===
Oren Jay Sofer's 'Say What You Mean' (2018) presents a synthesis of Marshall Rosenberg's Nonviolent Communication with contemporary mindfulness and somatic approaches. Sofer foregrounds present-moment, embodied attention and simple regulation practices — for example pausing, attending to breath and bodily sensation, and noticing impulses — as preparatory skills that help people access clearer observation, feeling, need and request work in high-emotion or trauma-sensitive contexts. The book frames these practices as a pragmatic, mindfulness-inflected complement to canonical NVC, offering step-by-step exercises intended to make NVC techniques more accessible and usable in everyday conversations.

=== Motivational interviewing ===
Motivational Interviewing, a counseling method that emphasizes reflective listening and eliciting intrinsic motivation, has been compared and combined with NVC in therapeutic and coaching contexts.

=== Restorative justice ===
Restorative justice processes have also incorporated NVC skills such as empathic listening and needs-focused dialogue to support accountability and reintegration after harm.

=== Transformative mediation and conflict transformation ===
In addition, transformative mediation and conflict-transformation frameworks, which prioritize empowerment and recognition, are noted to overlap with NVC's aim of altering relational dynamics and fostering mutual understanding rather than solely settling interests.

== Relationship to collective intelligence ==
Research in collective intelligence and group decision-making has identified communication culture as a structural determinant of a group's capacity to make effective collective decisions. Woolley et al. (2010), in a study of 699 participants working in groups of two to five, found that the strongest predictors of collective intelligence, defined as a general factor explaining group performance across diverse tasks, were the average social sensitivity of group members and the equality of turn-taking in conversation, rather than the individual intelligence of group members. Both of these predictors are conditions that NVC is specifically designed to create: social sensitivity is cultivated through the practice of empathic listening and attention to others' expressed feelings and needs, while equal participation is enabled by the replacement of evaluative and dominating communication patterns with observation-based and needs-focused expression.

Amy Edmondson's foundational research on psychological safety, defined as the shared belief within a group that members can take interpersonal risks without fear of punishment or humiliation, has similarly found that psychological safety is the strongest predictor of team learning and performance. Communication patterns consistent with NVC (observation without judgement, acknowledgement of feelings, and requests rather than demands) describe the interpersonal behaviours that create and sustain psychological safety. Conversely, the NVC concept of enemy images and moralistic judgements, which attribute problems to the character of others rather than to specific observable behaviours, corresponds to the communication patterns that Edmondson identifies as destructive of psychological safety and therefore of collective group performance.

A 2025 review by Ozturk and Fritsch, published in the European Center for Populism Studies journal Populism & Politics, applied the NVC framework to the analysis of populist political rhetoric, arguing that the communication patterns characteristic of authoritarian populism, including blame, moral absolutism, and dehumanisation, constitute forms of discursive violence that NVC is specifically designed to counter. The authors propose that NVC-informed communication training could build resilience in the public against manipulative rhetoric by cultivating the capacity to pause and ask what is being felt and needed rather than reacting to emotionally manipulative framing.

These connections have been noted in the context of deliberative democracy practice. NVC's four-component framework (observation, feelings, needs, requests) has been applied to citizens' assemblies and participatory democratic processes as a means of enabling participants from diverse backgrounds to engage with contested political questions without the communication patterns (character attack, coalition signalling, moralistic judgement) that suppress the minority voices on which collective intelligence depends.

== Relationship to spirituality ==
In the introduction to Rosenberg's book Nonviolent Communication: A Language of Life, NVC is described as a framework of several pre-existing concepts that Rosenberg found useful on the topic of communication and conflict resolution. Therefore, it is perhaps not surprising that some Christians have found NVC to be complementary to their Christian faith. Many people have found Nonviolent Communication to be very complementary to Buddhism, both in theory and in manifesting Buddhist ideals in practice. Furthermore, the "NVC consciousness" described in NVC have several similarities to the concepts of presence and patience in mindfulness. Marshall Rosenberg describes the influence of his spiritual life on the development and practice of NVC:

I think it is important that people see that spirituality is at the base of Nonviolent Communication, and that they learn the mechanics of the process with that in mind. It's really a spiritual practice that I am trying to show as a way of life. ... Even if they practice this as a mechanical technique, they start to experience things between themselves and other people they weren't able to experience before. So eventually they come to the spirituality of the process. They begin to see that it's more than a communication process and realize it's really an attempt to manifest a certain spirituality.

Rosenberg further states that he developed NVC as a way to "get conscious of" what he calls the "Beloved Divine Energy". Rosenberg considered NVC to be much more than a four-step process for communication, but rather a way of living, and a means to understand better what love means: "I could see it had so much meaning for so many millions of people in all of these religions. What is it, and how do you "do love"? Nonviolent Communication came out of my attempt to understand the concept of love and how to manifest it, how to do it."

== Organizations ==
The Center for Nonviolent Communication (CNVC), founded by Marshall Rosenberg, has trademarked the terms Nonviolent Communication: A Language of Life, The Center for Nonviolent Communication, and CNVC. The CNVC certifies trainers who wish to teach NVC in a manner aligned with CNVC's understanding of the NVC process. CNVC also offers trainings by certified trainers. A separate organisation, NVC Academy, also offers a large range of courses from reputable trainers. The CNVC offers events and trainings around the world in various languages. Numerous NVC organizations have sprung up around the world also, many with regional focuses. In the United Kingdom, trainings are offered by NVC Matters UK.

== See also ==
- Alternatives to Violence Project – Volunteer-run conflict transformation workshops
- Focusing (psychotherapy) – Psychotherapeutic technique
- Four-sides model – Communication theory model
- I-message – Assertion about the feelings, beliefs, values etc. of the person speaking
- Inner Relationship Focusing – Psychotherapeutic system
- Learning circle
- Mediation – Dispute resolution with assistance of a moderator
- People skills – Type of interpersonal skill
- Positive psychology – Approach of psychological scientific study
- Restorative justice – Restitution with input from victims and offenders
- Rogerian argument – Conflict-solving technique
- Social emotional development – Specific domain of child development
- T-groups – Form of group training
- Social justice – Concept in political philosophy
