= Marshall Rosenberg =

American psychologist and mediator (1934–2015)

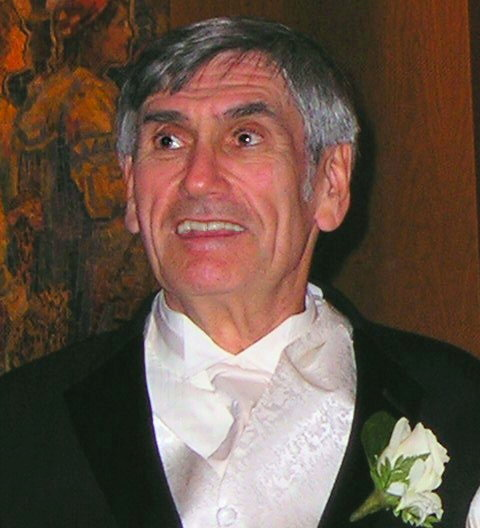
- Marshall Rosenberg in 2005
- Born: Marshall Bertram Rosenberg; October 6, 1934; Canton, Ohio, U.S.
- Died: February 7, 2015 (aged 80); Albuquerque, New Mexico, U.S.
- Education: University of Michigan; University of Wisconsin–Madison
- Occupations: Peacemaker; author
- Known for: Nonviolent communication

Marshall Bertram Rosenberg (October 6, 1934 – February 7, 2015) was an American psychologist, mediator, author, and teacher. Starting in the early 1960s, he developed nonviolent communication, a process for supporting partnership and resolving conflict within people, relationships, and society. He worked worldwide as a peacemaker, and in 1984 founded the Center for Nonviolent Communication, an international nonprofit organization for which he served as Director of Educational Services. Rosenberg's motivation for developing nonviolent communication was based on his own experiences at the Detroit race riot of 1943, as well as the antisemitism that he experienced in his early life.

== Family ==
Rosenberg was born in Canton, Ohio, to Jewish parents. His parents were Jean (née Wiener) Rosenberg and Fred Donald Rosenberg. Rosenberg's maternal grandmother, Anna Satovsky Wiener, had nine children. His grandfather worked at Packard Motor Car Company and his grandmother taught workers' children to dance. Wiener spent her final years living with ALS with the Rosenbergs, and Rosenberg credits his family's compassionate care for Wiener during the period in his later work.

In Steubenville, Ohio, Rosenberg's father loaded trucks with wholesale grocery stock, and Rosenberg himself went to a three-room school. Jean Rosenberg was a professional bowler with tournaments five nights per week. She was also a gambler with high-stakes backers. His parents divorced twice: once when Rosenberg was three and again when he left home.

The family moved to Detroit, Michigan, one week before the Detroit race riot of 1943 in which 34 people were killed and 433 wounded. At an inner-city school, Rosenberg discovered antisemitism and internalized it. Rosenberg married his first wife, Vivian, in 1961. They had three children. In 1974, he married his second wife, Gloria, whom he divorced in 1999. He married his third wife, Valentina (a.k.a. Kidini) in 2005, with whom he remained until his death in 2015.

== Education ==
At age 13 Rosenberg began Hebrew school but got expelled. Twice his father beat him, once so badly he missed school the next day. After Rosenberg's father bought a house in a better neighborhood, Rosenberg attended Cooley High School and graduated in 1952 as valedictorian. When considering medicine as a career, Rosenberg worked with an embalmer for a while to measure his interest in the human body. Rosenberg's first college was Wayne State University. He then entered the University of Michigan, and he worked as a waiter at a sorority and a cook's help at a fraternity. Putting up with antisemitism, he graduated in three years. The State of Wisconsin paid for Rosenberg's training as a psychologist.

Professor Michael Hakeem taught Rosenberg that psychology and psychiatry were dangerous, since scientific and value judgments were mixed in the fields. Hakeem also had Rosenberg read about traditional moral therapy in which clients were seen as down on their luck rather than sick. Rosenberg was influenced by the 1961 books The Myth of Mental Illness by Thomas Szasz and Asylums by Erving Goffman. He also remembered reading Albert Bandura on "Psychotherapy as a learning process".

Rosenberg's practicum placements were the Wisconsin Diagnostic Center, schools for delinquent girls and boys, and Mendota State Hospital. There, psychiatrist Bernie Banham "would never have it where we would talk about a client in his absence". In Mendota, Rosenberg began to practice family therapy with all parties present, including children. After graduation, Rosenberg worked in Winnebago with Gordon Filmer-Bennett for a year to fulfill his obligation to the state for his graduate training.

== Practice ==
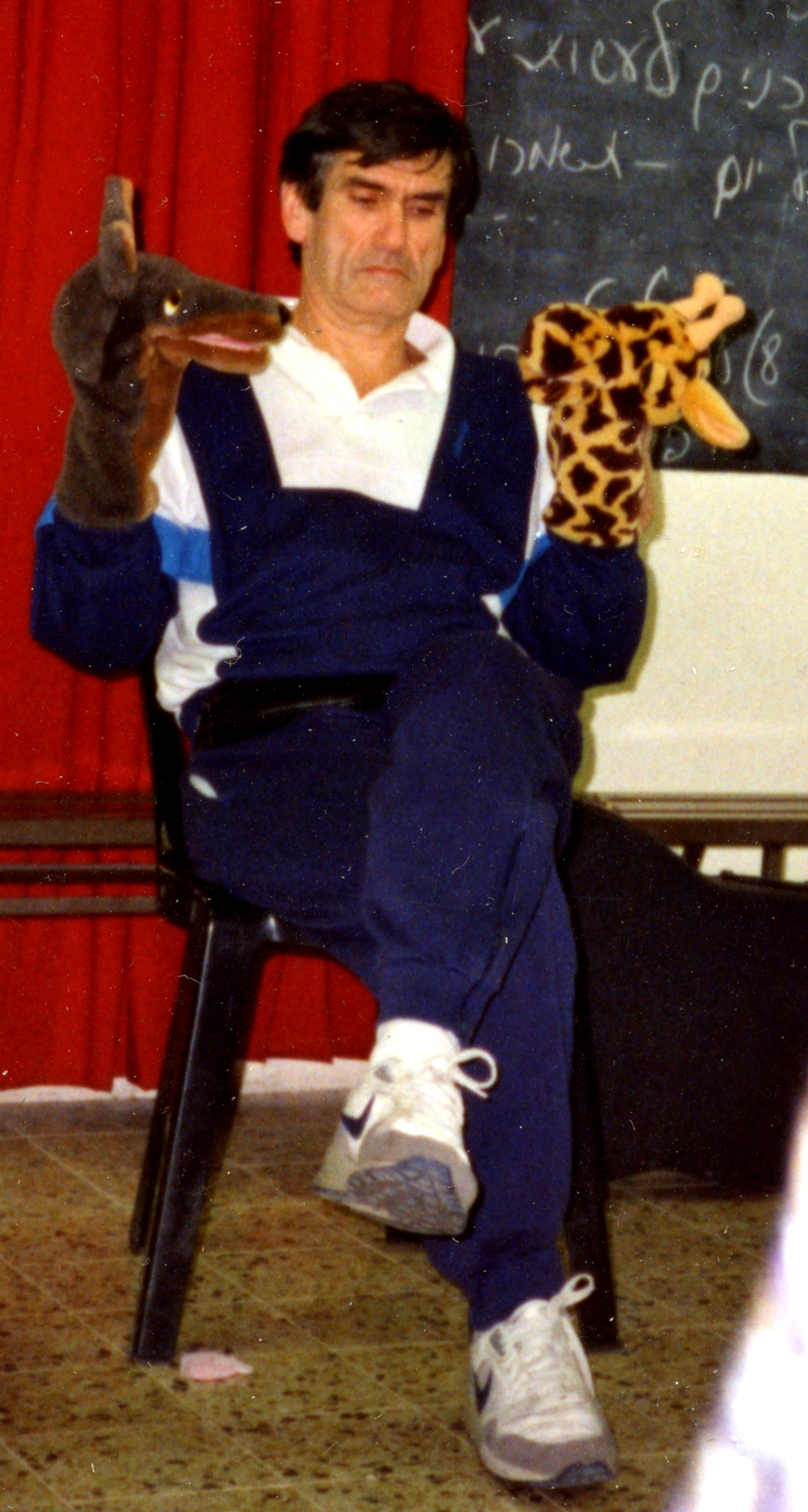
Rosenberg with hand puppets lecturing in a nonviolent communication workshop, 1990

In 1961, Rosenberg received his Ph.D. in clinical psychology from the University of Wisconsin–Madison, where he studied under Carl Rogers. His dissertation, Situational Structure and Self-evaluation, prefigured certain key aspects of his later work with nonviolent communication by focusing on "the relationship between (the) structure of social situations and two dimensions of self evaluation; positive self evaluation and certainty of self evaluation". In 1966 he was awarded Diplomate status in clinical psychology from the American Board of Examiners in Professional Psychology.

Rosenberg started out in clinical practice in Saint Louis, Missouri, forming Psychological Associates with partners. In making an analysis of problems of children in school, he found learning disabilities. He wrote his first book, Diagnostic Teaching, in 1968, reporting his findings. He also met Al Chappelle, a leader in the Zulu 1200s, a black liberation group in St. Louis. Rosenberg went to teach his approach to conflict resolution to the group in exchange for Chappelle appearing at desegregation conventions, starting in Washington, D.C. While Chappelle was harnessing communication against racism, Vicki Legion began to collaborate to counter sexism. "I started to give my services, instead of to individual affluent clients, to people on the firing line like Al and Vicki, and others fighting in behalf of human rights of various groups."

The superintendent of schools Thomas Shaheen in Rockford, Illinois, called upon Rosenberg to deal with conflicts in an alternative school that was established. In 1970 Shaheen became superintendent of schools in San Francisco, California, and was charged with racially integrating the city's schools. He called on Rosenberg to help as before and Rosenberg organized a group but Shaheen was dismissed before it could come into action. Rosenberg decided to stay in California and promoted the Community Council for Mutual Education with the help of Vicki Legion.

He worked for four years in Norfolk, Virginia's school integration. Rosenberg was called to many states, countries, and conflicts to provide his expertise in nonviolent communication. In 2004, he was visiting about 35 countries per year on his mission as a travelling peacemaker. From his home base at Albuquerque, Rosenberg supported his followers elsewhere with a Center of Nonviolent Communication in New Mexico. He died at home on February 7, 2015.

== Awards ==
- 2000: International Listening Association Listener of the Year Award
- 2002: Princess Anne of England and Chief of Police Restorative Justice Appreciation Award
- 2004: International Peace Prayer Day Man of Peace Award by the Healthy, Happy Holy (3HO) Organization
- 2004: Religious Science International Golden Works Award
- 2005: Light of God Expressing in Society Award from the Association of Unity Churches
- 2006: Bridge of Peace Nonviolence Award from the Global Village Foundation
- 2014: Hero and Champion of Forgiveness Award Worldwide Forgiveness Alliance

== Bibliography ==
- (1968) Diagnostic Teaching Special Child Publications (Out of Print) ISBN 0-87562-013-2
- (1972) Mutual Education: Toward Autonomy and Interdependence. Bernie Straub Publishing Co. (Out of Print) ISBN 0-87562-040-X
- (1972) A Manual for "Responsible" Thinking and Communicating. (55 pages) St. Lois, MI: Community Psychological Consultants
- (1976) From Now On. (149 pages) Community Psychological Consultants Inc., St. Louis, MO.
- (1983) A Model for Nonviolent Communication. (35 pages) Philadelphia, PA: New Society Publishers. ISBN 0865710295
- (1986) Duck Tales and Jackal Taming Hints. Booklet. (Out of Print)
- (1999) Nonviolent Communication: A Language of Compassion. (166 pages) First Edition. Encinitas, CA: PuddleDancer Press. ISBN 1892005026
- (2003) Speaking Peace: Connecting with Others Through Nonviolent Communication. (audiobook) ISBN 1591790778
- (2003) Nonviolent Communication: A Language of Life. (222 pages) Second Edition. Encinitas, CA: PuddleDancer Press. ISBN 1-892005-03-4
- (2003) Life-Enriching Education: NVC Helps Schools Improve Performance, Reduce Conflict and Enhance Relationships. (192 pages) Encinitas, CA: PuddleDancer Press. ISBN 1-892005-05-0
- (2004) We Can Work It Out: Resolving Conflicts Peacefully and Powerfully. (32 pages) ISBN 978-1892005120
- (2004) Teaching Children Compassionately: How Students and Teachers Can Succeed with Mutual Understanding (41 pages) ISBN 978-1892005113
- (2004) Raising Children Compassionately: Parenting the Nonviolent Communication Way. (48 pages) ISBN 978-1892005090
- (2004) The Heart of Social Change: How to Make a Difference in Your World. (45 pages) ISBN 978-1892005106
- (2004) Getting Past the Pain Between Us: Healing and Reconciliation Without Compromise. (48 pages) ISBN 978-1892005076
- (2005) The Surprising Purpose of Anger: Beyond Anger Management: Finding the Gift. (48 pages) ISBN 978-1892005151
- (2005) Speak Peace in a World of Conflict: What You Say Next Will Change Your World. (240 pages) Encinitas, CA: PuddleDancer Press. ISBN 1-892005-17-4
- (2005) Practical Spirituality: The Spiritual Basis of Nonviolent Communication. (32 pages) ISBN 978-1892005144
- (2005) Being Me, Loving You: A Practical Guide to Extraordinary Relationships. (80 pages) ISBN 978-1892005168
- (2012) Living Nonviolent Communication: Practical Tools to Connect and Communicate Skillfully in Every Situation. (288 pages; compilation of prior short works) Sounds True. ISBN 978-1604077872
- (2015) Nonviolent Communication: A Language of Life. (264 pages) Third Edition. Encinitas, CA: PuddleDancer Press. ISBN 978-1892005281

== See also ==
- List of peace activists
