= Compliment sandwich =

Rhetorical technique to deliver criticism

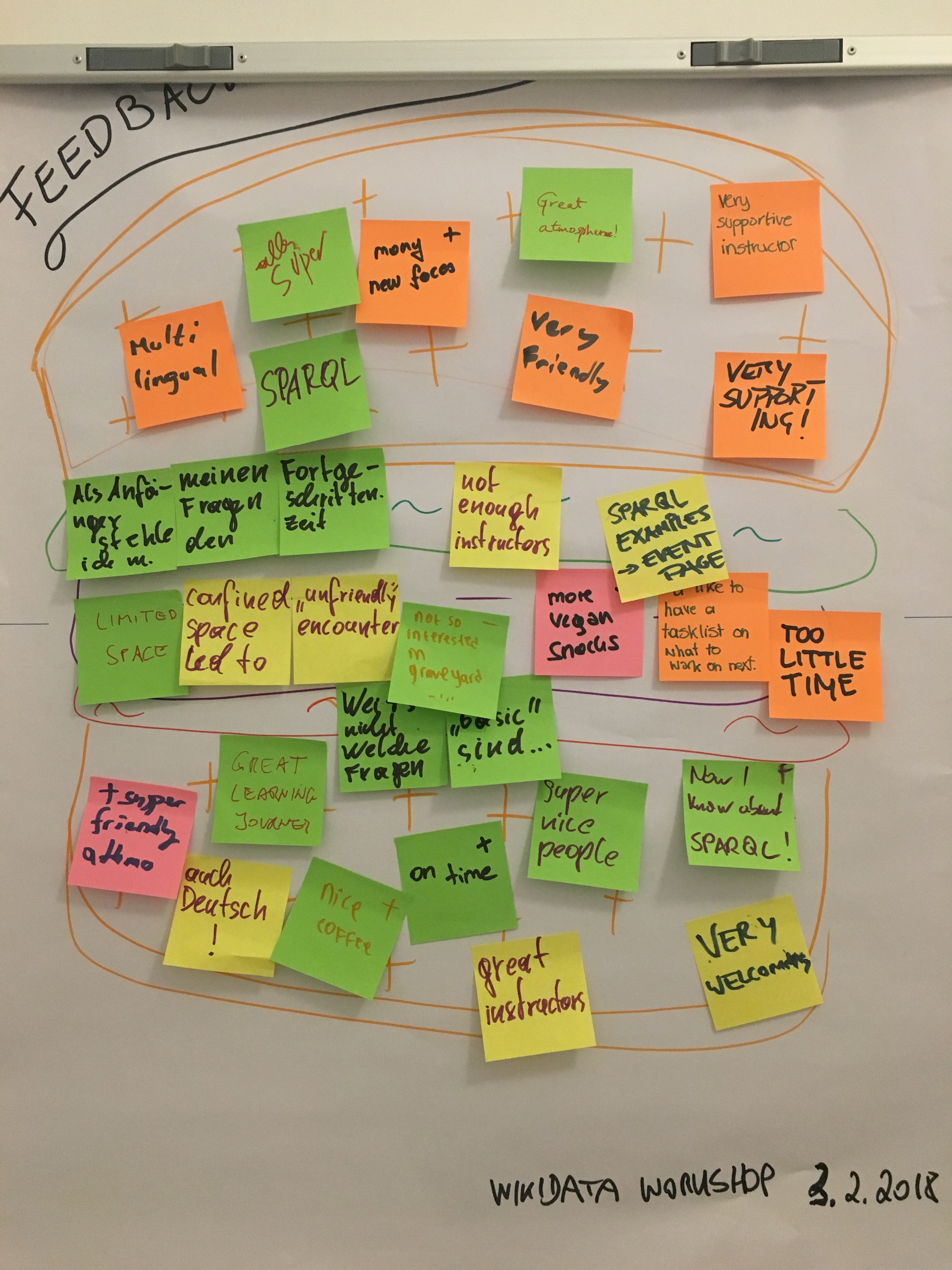
A diagram displaying feedback about a workshop in a sandwich shape. A background with + signs is for the positive evaluations; a background with ~ and - signs is for the negative evaluations.

A compliment sandwich, praise sandwich, or feedback sandwich is a rhetorical technique to deliver criticism in a way that it is accepted by the criticized person.

It is named after the metaphor of a sandwich since it has three parts:

1. Praise of the addressee
2. Expressing what the speaker dislikes about the person
3. Further praise of the addressee

It was popularised in the 1980s by Mary Kay Ash, the founder of Mary Kay Cosmetics, who advised managers to sandwich any critical remarks between layers of praise. Sandwich feedback has been recommended to sports trainers, health-service managers, online educators and sales personnel.

The intention of the sandwich device is to reduce defensiveness and discomfort, enhance useful communication and make the input better tolerated by the person receiving the coaching. It also aims to preserve the criticized person's self-esteem to increase receptivity. However, the outcome could be the complete opposite of the intention. The behaviour of praising before criticising can be misinterpreted as insincerity or merely instrumental, implying an inauthenticity or lack of trust, leading to its colloquial name of crap sandwich. Confusion and therefore backfire in productivity might be the case as the person criticized might misinterpret the feedback.

== Mechanism ==
A direct quote from Aubrey Daniel in his book, Oops!: 13 Management Practices that Waste Time and Money:

One of the easiest ways to encourage receptivity is to preface your criticism with a positive statement about the person's job performance or character. Once you've fortified his ego, deliver the bad news. Ensure that he received the message and knows how to correct the situation. Then close the conversation with an affirmation.

The rationale has face validity, i.e. it intuitively works, but there is little empirical research evidencing it is more effective in correcting the behaviour than a straightforward approach or other feedback sequences.

A study employing rigorous experimentation and counterbalancing methods find that the "positive–corrective–positive" feedback sequence is not the most effective. Instead, it was discovered that the "corrective–positive–positive" sequence is the most effective, while the "positive–positive–corrective" sequence is the least effective for delivering feedback when controlled for feedback timing.

In another controlled laboratory experiment, students given sandwich feedback – which includes general positive statements before and after constructive advice – prepared more thoroughly for subsequent math tasks and significantly outperformed those who received no feedback or only corrective feedback.

== Criticism ==
The receiver might feel very confused as the constructive advice is overshadowed by those at the beginning (primacy effect) or those at the end (recency effect). That is, people are more likely to remember to first and last thing of any chunk of information. They might fail to recognize and recollect most important part of the feedback, and therefore the original intention of advising is not achieved.

Over time, the employee might anticipate the negative feedback whenever the supervisors praise them. Such cases happen because the sandwich technique is learned through classical conditioning. Thus, the trustworthiness of the advice giver is diminished, and therefore the efficacy of giving any positive or constructive feedback shrinks.

The top and bottom of the sandwich might induce a further inaccurate self-assessment of the receiver. Given the Dunning-Kruger effect, people have such cognitive bias to overestimate their performance, stressing their positives might overinflate their self-esteem or self-efficacy, demolishing the effect of reinforcing that positive behaviour.

The essential reason for the ineffectiveness of sandwiching is not the delivery of negative feedback itself, but rather the manner through which the supervisor conveyed those messages. Robert A. Baron observed there is no anger nor tension generated if the person is given constructive criticism (specific, considerate feedback that does not suggest the poor performance results from negative internal attributions such as the person being stupid or lazy), in contrast to destructive criticism. In other words, if the feedback is authentic and it is delivered in a genuine manner, the outcome is more likely to be favorable.

== Alternatives ==
Aubrey Daniels (2001) indicated "'Always be positive' is the worst advice you could ever give or receive", when correcting worker conduct. Sincerity and straightforwardness are the key to effective communication. In Bressler, Von Bergen, & Campbell's article, they provide a guideline with 9 steps for correct correcting:

1. Plan the discussion, when possible.
2. Keep positives and negatives separate.
3. Time discipline so as not to be too soon or too late.
4. Focus on the issue regarding employee behaviour.
5. Connect the behavioural issue to how the issue impacts the business.
6. State consequences if behaviour does not improve.
7. Identify the proper and required behavioural change that the supervisor expects.
8. Ask how the manager can help the worker.
9. Express confidence in the employee's ability to improve.

Many others have provided an alternative framework or guideline for constructive criticism. And for those who advocate for using a compliment sandwich, we can see that they recommend the technique with emphasis on the quality of parsing and criticising. Statements such as "be specific about the behaviour you want the employee to change" need to be well-timed, well-targeted, and well-said, and above all must reflect actual concerns.

== See also ==
- Corrective feedback – Practice in the field of learning and achievement
- Constructive criticism
- Performance appraisal – Method to document and evaluate an employee's job performance
- Truth sandwich – Technique in journalism
