= Thomas Gordon (psychologist) =

American psychologist (1918–2002)

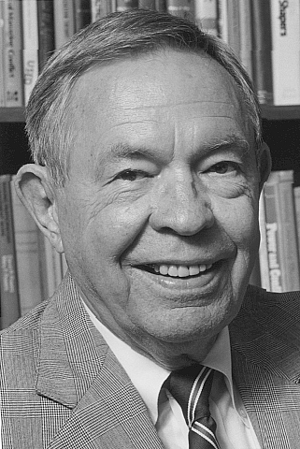
- Born: March 11, 1918
- Died: August 26, 2002; Solana Beach, California
- Occupation: Psychologist

Thomas Gordon (March 11, 1918 – August 26, 2002) was an American clinical psychologist and colleague of Carl Rogers. He is widely recognized as a pioneer in teaching communication skills and conflict resolution methods to parents, teachers, leaders, women, youth and salespeople. The model he developed came to be known as the Gordon Model or the Gordon Method, a complete and integrated system for building and maintaining effective relationships.

== Work ==
Gordon strongly believed that the use of coercive power damages relationships. As an alternative, he taught people skills for communicating and resolving conflicts that they can use to establish or improve good relationships at home, school and at work. These skills include active listening, I-messages and No-Lose Conflict Resolution. He first applied some of these methods in the 1950s as a consultant to business organizations. Then in 1962, he introduced Parent Effectiveness Training (P.E.T.), a course recognized as the first skill-based training program for parents. He taught the first class to a group of 14 parents in a Pasadena, California cafeteria. He then began training instructors throughout the U.S. to teach it in their communities. Over the next several years, the course spread to all 50 states.

In 1970, Gordon wrote the Parent Effectiveness Training (P.E.T.) book to extend the reach of this new parenting philosophy. To date, the P.E.T. book (revised in 2000) has been published in 33 languages and sold over five million copies. Over a million people have participated in the course in 45 countries around the world.

As P.E.T. became known in the educational world, many schools wanted their teachers to learn the same skills so he developed the Teacher Effectiveness Training (T.E.T.) course and in 1974, wrote the Teacher Effectiveness Training (T.E.T.) book (with Noel Burch). The T.E.T. course has been offered around the world as a model that eliminates authoritarian teaching and punitive discipline in the classroom.

Although it was a new idea in the 1950s, Gordon's Leader Effectiveness Training (L.E.T.) program became more popular in the 1970s with the increasing acceptance of participative management in the U.S. This course has been taught in hundreds of companies, including many of the Fortune 500. He is recognized as a pioneer in developing a model of democratic and collaborative leadership and identifying the effective communication skills it requires.

Both the American Psychological Foundation and the California Psychological Association presented him with lifetime achievement awards. Gordon Training International in Solana Beach, California, the company he founded in 1974, continues his work. His widow, Linda Adams, is the current president and CEO of Gordon Training International.

== Gordon Method ==
The method emphasizes effective communication and conflict resolution using the win-win strategy. Other skills from his program are active listening and the use of I-messages.

Besides P.E.T., Dr. Gordon and his organization has introduced Gordon workshops for leaders (L.E.T.), adults (Be Your Best), youth (Y.E.T and Resolving Conflicts at School), teachers (T.E.T.), salespeople (Synergistic Selling).

== Select bibliography ==
- Children Don't Misbehave by Thomas Gordon, Ph.D.
- The Power of the Language of Acceptance by Thomas Gordon, Ph.D.
- How Children Really React to Control by Thomas Gordon, Ph.D.
