= Emotionally focused therapy =

Family of related psychotherapies

Emotionally focused therapy and emotion-focused therapy (EFT) are related humanistic approaches to psychotherapy that aim to resolve emotional and relationship issues with individuals, couples, and families. These therapies combine experiential therapy techniques, including person-centered and Gestalt therapies, with systemic therapy and attachment theory. The central premise is that emotions influence cognition, motivate behavior, and are strongly linked to needs. The goals of treatment include transforming maladaptive behaviors, such as emotional avoidance, and developing awareness, acceptance, expression, and regulation of emotion and understanding of relationships. EFT is usually a short-term treatment (eight to 20 sessions).

Emotion-focused therapy for individuals was originally known as process-experiential therapy, and continues to be referred to by this name in some contexts. EFT should not be confused with emotion-focused coping, a separate concept involving coping strategies for managing emotions. EFT has been used to improve clients' emotion-focused coping abilities.

== History ==
EFT began in the mid-1980s as an approach to helping couples. EFT was originally formulated and tested by Les Greenberg and his student Sue Johnson in 1985, and the first manual for emotionally focused couples therapy was published in 1988.

To develop the approach, Johnson and Greenberg began reviewing videos of sessions of couples therapy to identify, through observation and task analysis, the elements that lead to positive change. They were influenced in their observations by the humanistic experiential psychotherapies of Carl Rogers and Fritz Perls, both of whom valued (in different ways) present-moment emotional experience for its power to create meaning and guide behavior. Johnson and Greenberg saw the need to combine experiential therapy with the systems theoretical view that meaning-making and behavior cannot be considered outside of the whole situation in which they occur. In this "experiential–systemic" approach to couples therapy, as in other approaches to systemic therapy, the problem is viewed as belonging not to one partner, but rather to the cyclical reinforcing patterns of interactions between partners. Emotion is viewed not only as an intra-individual fact, but also as a part of the whole system that organizes the interactions between partners.

In 1986, Greenberg chose "to refocus his efforts on developing and studying an experiential approach to individual therapy". Greenberg and colleagues shifted their attention away from couples therapy toward individual psychotherapy. They attended to emotional experiencing and its role in individual self-organization. Building on the experiential theories of Rogers and Perls and others such as Eugene Gendlin, as well as on their own extensive work on information processing and the adaptive role of emotion in human functioning, Greenberg, Rice & Elliott (1993) created a treatment manual with numerous clearly outlined principles for what they called a process-experiential approach to psychological change. Elliott et al. (2004) and Goldman & Greenberg (2015) have further expanded the process-experiential approach, providing detailed manuals of specific principles and methods of therapeutic intervention. Goldman & Greenberg (2015) presented case formulation maps for this approach.

Johnson continued to develop EFT for couples, integrating attachment theory with systemic and humanistic approaches, and explicitly expanding attachment theory's understanding of love relationships. Johnson's model retained the original three stages and nine steps and two sets of interventions that aim to reshape the attachment bond: one set of interventions to track and restructure patterns of interaction and one to access and reprocess emotion (see § Stages and steps below). Johnson's goal is the creation of positive cycles of interpersonal interaction wherein individuals are able to ask for and offer comfort and support to safe others, facilitating interpersonal emotion regulation.

Greenberg & Goldman (2008) developed a variation of EFT for couples that contains some elements from Greenberg and Johnson's original formulation but adds several steps and stages. Greenberg and Goldman posit three motivational dimensions—(1) attachment, (2) identity or power, and (3) attraction or liking—that impact emotion regulation in intimate relationships.

== Similar terminology, different meanings ==
The terms emotion-focused therapy and emotionally focused therapy have different meanings for different therapists.

In Les Greenberg's approach the term emotion-focused is sometimes used to refer to psychotherapy approaches in general that emphasize emotion. Greenberg "decided that on the basis of the development in emotion theory that treatments such as the process experiential approach, as well as some other approaches that emphasized emotion as the target of change, were sufficiently similar to each other and different from existing approaches to merit being grouped under the general title of emotion-focused approaches." He and colleague Rhonda Goldman noted their choice to "use the more American phrasing of emotion-focused to refer to therapeutic approaches that focused on emotion, rather than the original, possibly more English term (reflecting both Greenberg's and Johnson's backgrounds) emotionally focused." Greenberg uses the term emotion-focused to suggest assimilative integration of an emotional focus into any approach to psychotherapy. He considers the focus on emotions to be a common factor among various systems of psychotherapy: "The term emotion-focused therapy will, I believe, be used in the future, in its integrative sense, to characterize all therapies that are emotion-focused, be they psychodynamic, cognitive-behavioral, systemic, or humanistic." Greenberg co-authored a chapter on the importance of research by clinicians and integration of psychotherapy approaches that stated:

In addition to these empirical findings, leaders of major orientations have voiced serious criticisms of their preferred theoretical approaches, while encouraging an open-minded attitude toward other orientations.... Furthermore, clinicians of different orientations recognized that their approaches did not provide them with the clinical repertoire sufficient to address the diversity of clients and their presenting problems.

Sue Johnson's use of the term emotionally focused therapy refers to a specific model of relationship therapy that explicitly integrates systems and experiential approaches and places prominence upon attachment theory as a theory of emotion regulation. Johnson views attachment needs as a primary motivational system for mammalian survival; her approach to EFT focuses on attachment theory as a theory of adult love wherein attachment, care-giving, and sex are intertwined. Attachment theory is seen to subsume the search for personal autonomy, dependability of the other and a sense of personal and interpersonal attractiveness, love-ability and desire. Johnson's approach to EFT aims to reshape attachment strategies towards optimal inter-dependency and emotion regulation, for resilience and physical, emotional, and relational health.

== Features ==
=== Experiential focus ===
All EFT approaches have retained emphasis on the importance of Rogerian empathic attunement and communicated understanding. They all focus upon the value of engaging clients in emotional experiencing moment-to-moment in session. Thus, an experiential focus is prominent in all EFT approaches. All EFT theorists have expressed the view that individuals engage with others on the basis of their emotions, and construct a sense of self from the drama of repeated emotionally laden interactions.

The information-processing theory of emotion and emotional appraisal (in accordance with emotion theorists such as Magda B. Arnold, Paul Ekman, Nico Frijda, and James Gross) and the humanistic, experiential emphasis on moment-to-moment emotional expression (developing the earlier psychotherapy approaches of Carl Rogers, Fritz Perls, and Eugene Gendlin) have been strong components of all EFT approaches since their inception. EFT approaches value emotion as the target and agent of change, honoring the intersection of emotion, cognition, and behavior. EFT approaches posit that emotion is the first, often subconscious response to experience. All EFT approaches also use the framework of primary and secondary (reactive) emotion responses.

=== Maladaptive emotion responses and negative patterns of interaction ===
Greenberg and some other EFT theorists have categorized emotion responses into four types (see § Emotion response types below) to help therapists decide how to respond to a client at a particular time: primary adaptive, primary maladaptive, secondary reactive, and instrumental. Greenberg has posited six principles of emotion processing: (1) awareness of emotion or naming what one feels, (2) emotional expression, (3) regulation of emotion, (4) reflection on experience, (5) transformation of emotion by emotion, and (6) corrective experience of emotion through new lived experiences in therapy and in the world. While primary adaptive emotion responses are seen as a reliable guide for behavior in the present situation, primary maladaptive emotion responses are seen as an unreliable guide for behavior in the present situation (alongside other possible emotional difficulties such as lack of emotional awareness, emotion dysregulation, and problems in meaning-making).

Johnson rarely distinguishes between adaptive and maladaptive primary emotion responses, and rarely distinguishes emotion responses as dysfunctional or functional. Instead, primary emotional responses are usually construed as normal survival reactions in the face of what John Bowlby called "separation distress". EFT for couples, like other systemic therapies that emphasize interpersonal relationships, presumes that the patterns of interpersonal interaction are the problematic or dysfunctional element. The patterns of interaction are amenable to change after accessing the underlying primary emotion responses that are subconsciously driving the ineffective, negative reinforcing cycles of interaction. Validating reactive emotion responses and reprocessing newly accessed primary emotion responses is part of the change process.

== Individual therapy ==
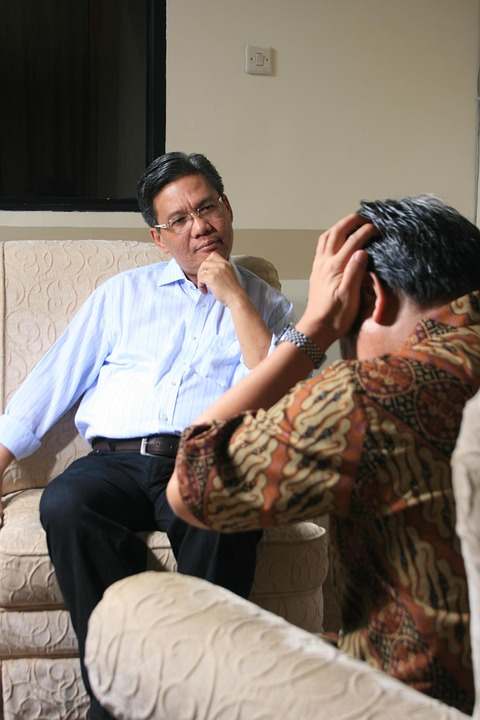
Individual therapy

Goldman & Greenberg 2015 proposed a 14-step case formulation process that regards emotion-related problems as stemming from at least four different possible causes: lack of awareness or avoidance of emotion, dysregulation of emotion, maladaptive emotion response, or a problem with making meaning of experiences. The theory features four types of emotion response (see § Emotion response types below), categorizes needs under "attachment" and "identity", specifies four types of emotional processing difficulties, delineates different types of empathy, has at least a dozen different task markers (see § Therapeutic tasks below), relies on two interactive tracks of emotion and narrative processes as sources of information about a client, and presumes a dialectical-constructivist model of psychological development and an emotion schematic system.

The emotion schematic system is seen as the central catalyst of self-organization, often at the base of dysfunction and ultimately the road to cure. For simplicity, we use the term emotion schematic process to refer to the complex synthesis process in which a number of co-activated emotion schemes co-apply, to produce a unified sense of self in relation to the world.

Techniques used in "coaching clients to work through their feelings" may include the Gestalt therapy empty chair technique, frequently used for resolving "unfinished business", and the two-chair technique, frequently used for self-critical splits.

=== Emotion response types ===
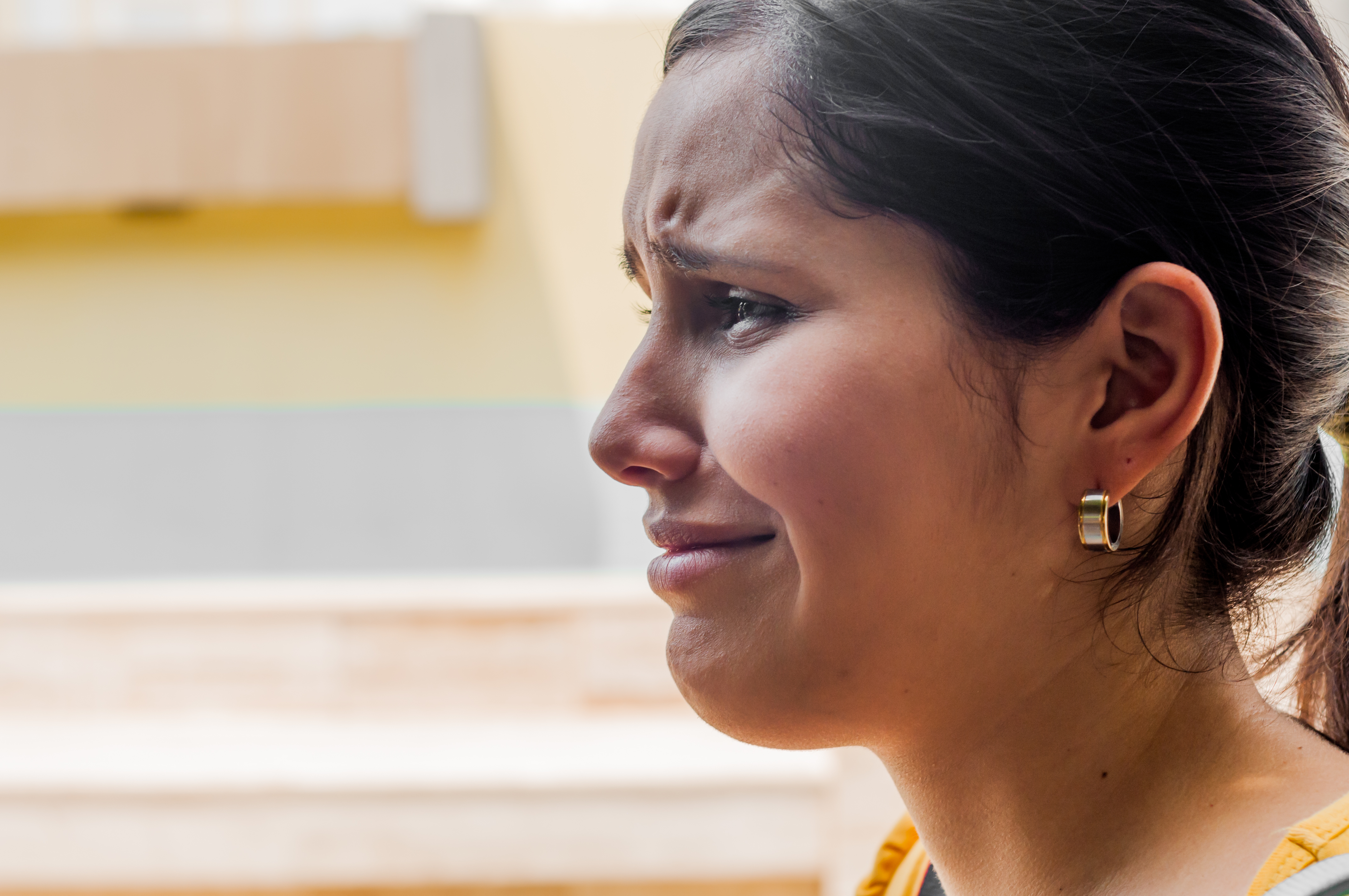
Sadness

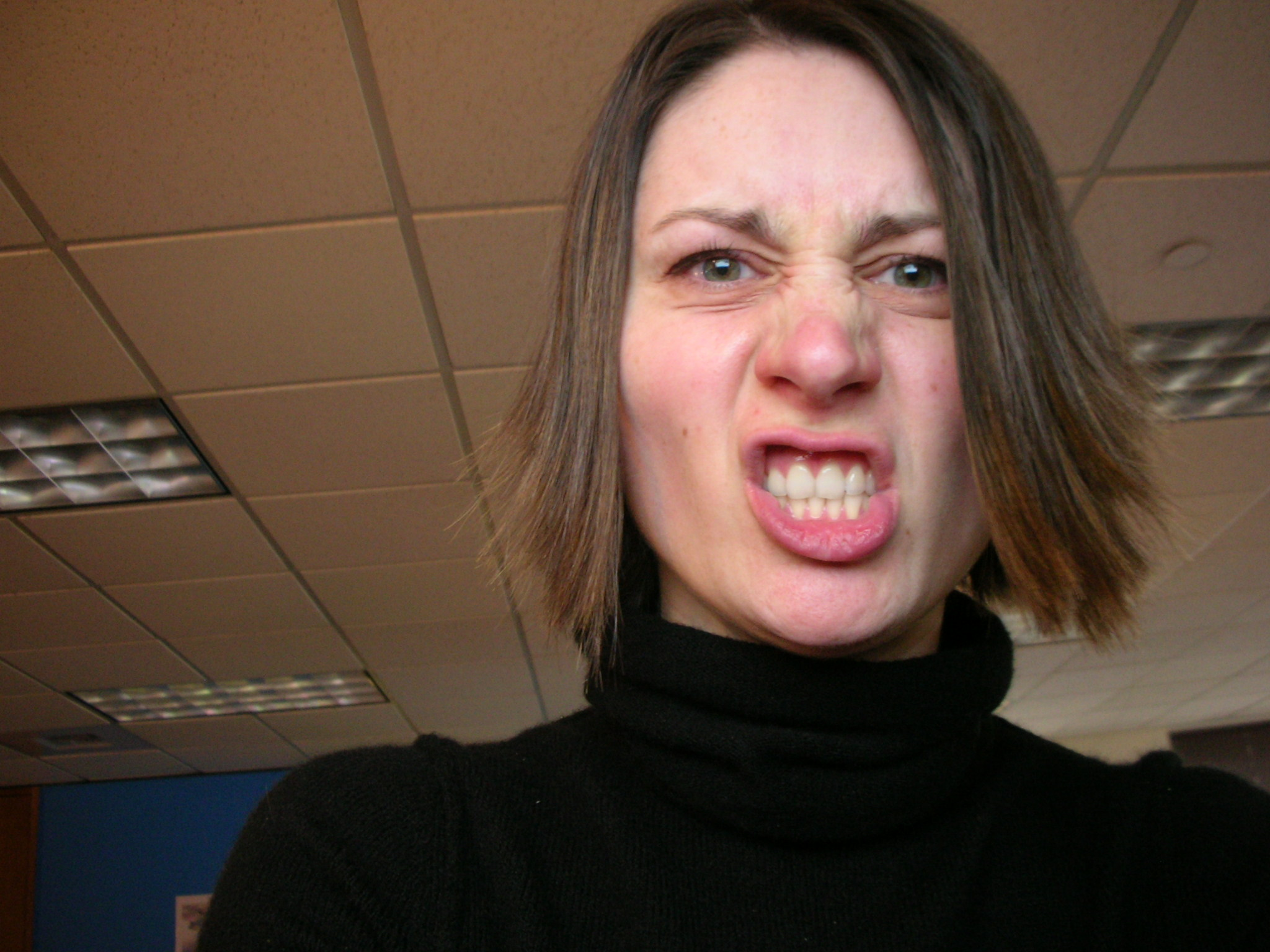
Anger

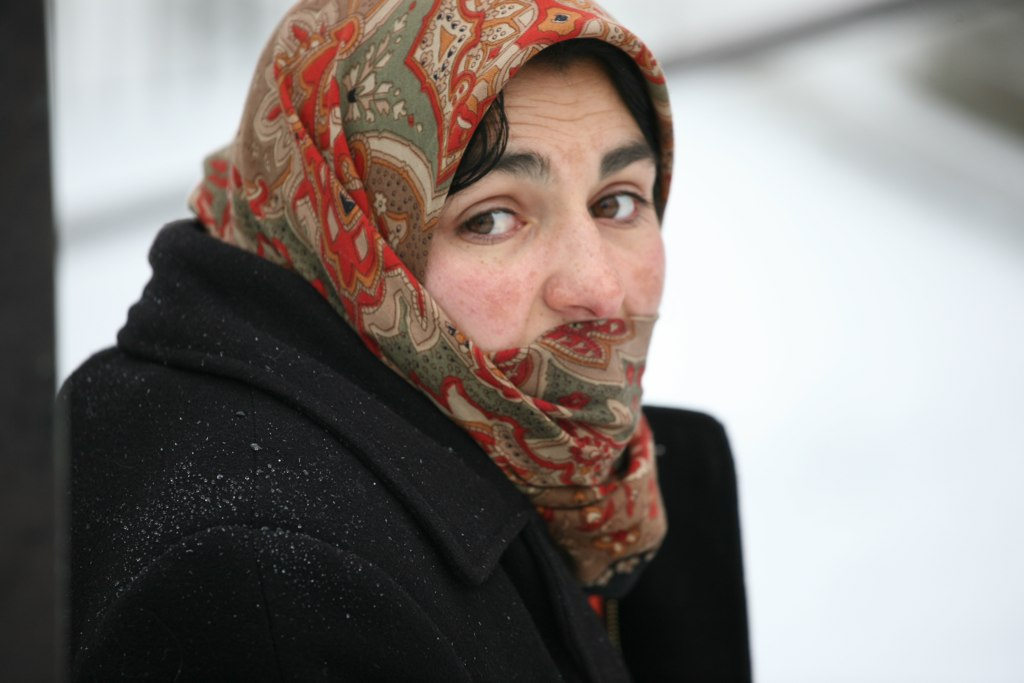
Fear

Emotion-focused theorists have posited that each person's emotions are organized into idiosyncratic emotion schemes that are highly variable both between people and within the same person over time, but for practical purposes emotional responses can be classified into four broad types: primary adaptive, primary maladaptive, secondary reactive, and instrumental.

1. Primary adaptive emotion responses are initial emotional responses to a given stimulus that have a clear beneficial value in the present situation—for example, sadness at loss, anger at violation, and fear at threat. Sadness is an adaptive response when it motivates people to reconnect with someone or something important that is missing. Anger is an adaptive response when it motivates people to take assertive action to end the violation. Fear is an adaptive response when it motivates people to avoid or escape an overwhelming threat. In addition to emotions that indicate action tendencies (such as the three just mentioned), primary adaptive emotion responses include the feeling of being certain and in control or uncertain and out of control, and/or a general felt sense of emotional pain—these feelings and emotional pain do not provide immediate action tendencies but do provide adaptive information that can be symbolized and worked through in therapy. Primary adaptive emotion responses "are attended to and expressed in therapy in order to access the adaptive information and action tendency to guide problem solving."
2. Primary maladaptive emotion responses are also initial emotional responses to a given stimulus; however, they are based on emotion schemes that are no longer useful (and that may or may not have been useful in the person's past) and that were often formed through previous traumatic experiences. Examples include sadness at the joy of others, anger at the genuine caring or concern of others, fear at harmless situations, and chronic feelings of insecurity/fear or worthlessness/shame. For example, a person may respond with anger at the genuine caring or concern of others because as a child he or she was offered caring or concern that was usually followed by a violation; as a result, he or she learned to respond to caring or concern with anger even when there is no violation. The person's angry response is understandable, and needs to be met with empathy and compassion even though his or her angry response is not helpful. Primary maladaptive emotion responses are accessed in therapy with the aim of transforming the emotion scheme through new experiences.
3. Secondary reactive emotion responses are complex chain reactions where a person reacts to his or her primary adaptive or maladaptive emotional response and then replaces it with another, secondary emotional response. In other words, they are emotional responses to prior emotional responses. ("Secondary" means that a different emotion response occurred first.) They can include secondary reactions of hopelessness, helplessness, rage, or despair that occur in response to primary emotion responses that are experienced (secondarily) as painful, uncontrollable, or violating. They may be escalations of a primary emotion response, as when people are angry about being angry, afraid of their fear, or sad about their sadness. They may be defenses against a primary emotion response, such as feeling anger to avoid sadness or fear to avoid anger; this can include gender role-stereotypical responses such as expressing anger when feeling primarily afraid (stereotypical of men's gender role), or expressing sadness when primarily angry (stereotypical of women's gender role). "These are all complex, self-reflexive processes of reacting to one's emotions and transforming one emotion into another. Crying, for example, is not always true grieving that leads to relief, but rather can be the crying of secondary helplessness or frustration that results in feeling worse." Secondary reactive emotion responses are accessed and explored in therapy in order to increase awareness of them and to arrive at more primary and adaptive emotion responses.
4. Instrumental emotion responses are experienced and expressed by a person because the person has learned that the response has an effect on others, "such as getting them to pay attention to us, to go along with something we want them to do for us, to approve of us, or perhaps most often just not to disapprove of us." Instrumental emotion responses can be consciously intended or unconsciously learned (i.e., through operant conditioning). Examples include crocodile tears (instrumental sadness), bullying (instrumental anger), crying wolf (instrumental fear), and feigned embarrassment (instrumental shame). When a client responds in therapy with instrumental emotion responses, it may feel manipulative or superficial to the therapist. Instrumental emotion responses are explored in therapy in order to increase awareness of their interpersonal function and/or the associated primary and secondary gain.

=== The therapeutic process with different emotion responses ===
Emotion-focused theorists have proposed that each type of emotion response calls for a different intervention process by the therapist. Primary adaptive emotion responses need be more fully allowed and accessed for their adaptive information. Primary maladaptive emotion responses need to be accessed and explored to help the client identify core unmet needs (e.g., for validation, safety, or connection), and then regulated and transformed with new experiences and new adaptive emotions. Secondary reactive emotion responses need empathic exploration in order to discover the sequence of emotions that preceded them. Instrumental emotion responses need to be explored interpersonally in the therapeutic relationship to increase awareness of them and address how they are functioning in the client's situation.

Primary emotion responses are not called "primary" because they are somehow more real than the other responses; all of the responses feel real to a person, but therapists can classify them into these four types in order to help clarify the functions of the response in the client's situation and how to intervene appropriately.

=== Therapeutic tasks ===
A therapeutic task is an immediate problem that a client needs to resolve in a psychotherapy session. In the 1970s and 1980s, researchers such as Laura North Rice (a former colleague of Carl Rogers) applied task analysis to transcripts of psychotherapy sessions in an attempt to describe in more detail the process of clients' cognitive and emotional change, so that therapists might more reliably provide optimal conditions for change. This kind of psychotherapy process research eventually led to a standardized (and evolving) set of therapeutic tasks in emotion-focused therapy for individuals.

The following table summarizes the standard set of these therapeutic tasks as of 2012. The tasks are classified into five broad groups: empathy-based, relational, experiencing, reprocessing, and action. The task marker is an observable sign that a client may be ready to work on the associated task. The intervention process is a sequence of actions carried out by therapist and client in working on the task. The end state is the desired resolution of the immediate problem.

In addition to the task markers listed below, other markers and intervention processes for working with emotion and narrative have been specified: same old stories, empty stories, unstoried emotions, and broken stories.

Therapeutic tasks in emotion-focused therapy for individuals
	Task marker	Intervention process	End state
Empathy-based tasks	Problem-relevant experience (e.g., interesting, troubling, intense, puzzling)	Empathic exploration	Clear marker, or new meaning explicated
Empathy-based tasks	Vulnerability (painful emotion related to self)	Empathic affirmation	Self-affirmation (feels understood, hopeful, stronger)
Relational tasks	Beginning of therapy	Alliance formation	Productive working environment
Relational tasks	Therapy complaint or withdrawal difficulty (questioning goals or tasks; persistent avoidance of relationship or work)	Alliance dialogue (each explores own role in difficulty)	Alliance repair (stronger therapeutic bond or investment in therapy; greater self-understanding)
Experiencing tasks	Attentional focus difficulty (e.g., confused, overwhelmed, blank)	Clearing a space	Therapeutic focus; ability to work productively with experiencing (working distance)
Experiencing tasks	Unclear feeling (vague, external or abstract)	Experiential focusing	Symbolization of felt sense; sense of easing (feeling shift); readiness to apply outside of therapy (carrying forward)
Experiencing tasks	Difficulty expressing feelings (avoiding feelings, difficulty answering feeling questions)	Allowing and expressing emotion (also experiential focusing, systematic evocative unfolding, chairwork)	Successful, appropriate expression of emotion to therapist and others
Reprocessing tasks [situational-perceptual]	Difficult/traumatic experiences (narrative pressure to tell painful life stories)	Trauma retelling	Relief, validation, restoration of narrative gaps, understanding of broader meaning
Reprocessing tasks [situational-perceptual]	Problematic reaction point (puzzling over-reaction to specific situation)	Systematic evocative unfolding	New view of self in-the-world-functioning
Reprocessing tasks [situational-perceptual]	Meaning protest (life event violates cherished belief)	Meaning creation work	Revision of cherished belief
Action tasks [action tendency]	Self-evaluative split (self-criticism, tornness)	Two-chair dialogue	Self-acceptance, integration
Action tasks [action tendency]	Self-interruption split (blocked feelings, resignation)	Two-chair enactment	Self-expression, empowerment
Action tasks [action tendency]	Unfinished business (lingering bad feeling regarding significant other)	Empty-chair work	Let go of resentments, unmet needs regarding other; affirm self; understand or hold other accountable
Action tasks [action tendency]	Stuck, disregulated anguish	Compassionate self-soothing	Emotional/bodily relief, self-empowerment

Experienced therapists can create new tasks; EFT therapist Robert Elliott, in a 2010 interview, noted that "the highest level of mastery of the therapy—EFT included—is to be able to create new structures, new tasks. You haven't really mastered EFT or some other therapy until you actually can begin to create new tasks."

=== Emotion-focused therapy for trauma ===
The interventions and the structure of emotion-focused therapy have been adapted for the specific needs of psychological trauma survivors. A manual of emotion-focused therapy for individuals with complex trauma (EFTT) has been published. For example, modifications of the traditional Gestalt empty chair technique have been developed.

=== Other versions of EFT for individuals ===
Brubacher (2017) proposed an emotionally focused approach to individual therapy that focuses on attachment, while integrating the experiential focus of empathic attunement for engaging and reprocessing emotional experience and tracking and restructuring the systemic aspects and patterns of emotion regulation. The therapist follows the attachment model by addressing deactivating and hyperactivating strategies. Individual therapy is seen as a process of developing secure connections between therapist and client, between client and past and present relationships, and within the client. Attachment principles guide therapy in the following ways: forming the collaborative therapeutic relationship, shaping the overall goal for therapy to be that of "effective dependency" (following John Bowlby) upon one or two safe others, depathologizing emotion by normalizing separation distress responses, and shaping change processes. The change processes are: identifying and strengthening patterns of emotion regulation, and creating corrective emotional experiences to transform negative patterns into secure bonds.

Gayner (2019) integrated EFT principles and methods with mindfulness-based cognitive therapy and mindfulness-based stress reduction.

== Couples therapy ==
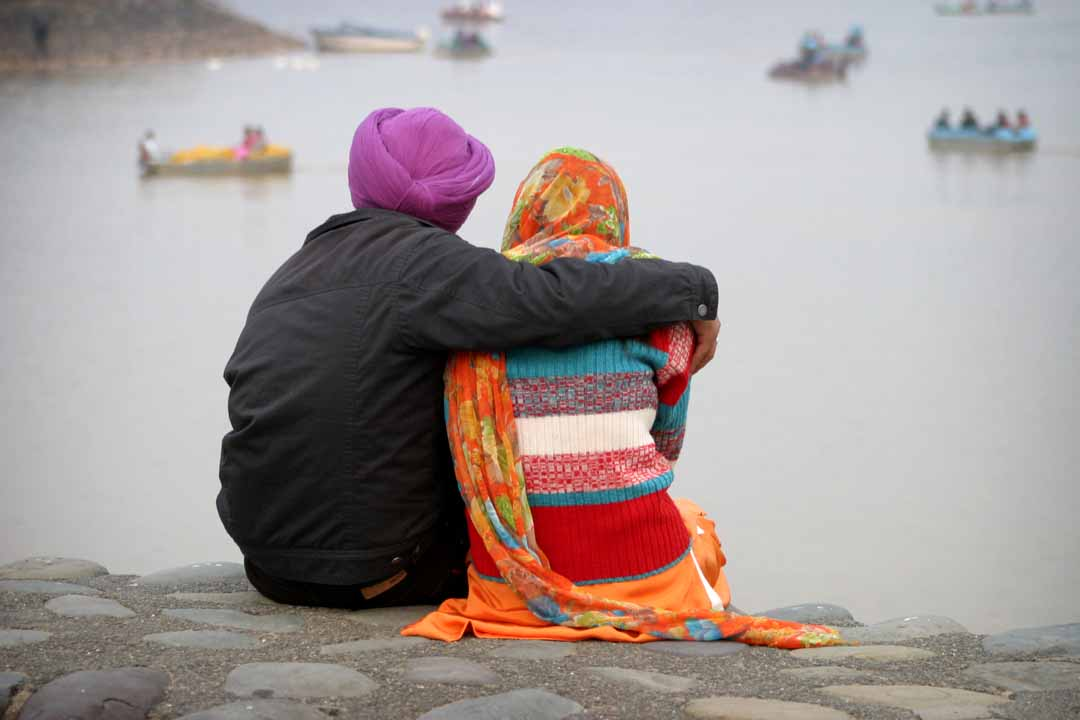
A couple

A systemic perspective is important in all approaches to EFT for couples. Tracking conflictual patterns of interaction, often referred to as a "dance" in Johnson's popular literature, has been a hallmark of the first stage of Johnson and Greenberg's approach since its inception in 1985. In Goldman and Greenberg's newer approach, therapists help clients "also work toward self-change and the resolution of pain stemming from unmet childhood needs that affect the couple interaction, in addition to working on interactional change." Goldman and Greenberg justify their added emphasis on self-change by noting that not all problems in a relationship can be solved only by tracking and changing patterns of interaction:

In addition, in our observations of psychotherapeutic work with couples, we have found that problems or difficulties that can be traced to core identity concerns such as needs for validation or a sense of worth are often best healed through therapeutic methods directed toward the self rather than to the interactions. For example, if a person's core emotion is one of shame and they feel "rotten at the core" or "simply fundamentally flawed," soothing or reassuring from one's partner, while helpful, will not ultimately solve the problem, lead to structural emotional change, or alter the view of oneself.

In Greenberg and Goldman's approach to EFT for couples, although they "fully endorse" the importance of attachment, attachment is not considered to be the only interpersonal motivation of couples; instead, attachment is considered to be one of three aspects of relational functioning, along with issues of identity/power and attraction/liking. In Johnson's approach, attachment theory is considered to be the defining theory of adult love, subsuming other motivations, and it guides the therapist in processing and reprocessing emotion.

In Greenberg and Goldman's approach, the emphasis is on working with core issues related to identity (working models of self and other) and promoting both self-soothing and other-soothing for a better relationship, in addition to interactional change. In Johnson's approach, the primary goal is to reshape attachment bonds and create "effective dependency" (including secure attachment).

=== Stages and steps ===
EFT for couples features a nine-step model of restructuring the attachment bond between partners. In this approach, the aim is to reshape the attachment bond and create more effective co-regulation and "effective dependency", increasing individuals' self-regulation and resilience. In good-outcome cases, the couple is helped to respond and thereby meet each other's unmet needs and injuries from childhood. The newly shaped secure attachment bond may become the best antidote to a traumatic experience from within and outside of the relationship.

Adding to the original three-stage, nine-step EFT framework developed by Johnson and Greenberg, Greenberg and Goldman's emotion-focused therapy for couples has five stages and 14 steps. It is structured to work on identity issues and self-regulation prior to changing negative interactions. It is considered necessary, in this approach, to help partners experience and reveal their own underlying vulnerable feelings first, so they are better equipped to do the intense work of attuning to the other partner and to be open to restructuring interactions and the attachment bond.

Johnson (2008) summarizes the nine treatment steps in Johnson's model of EFT for couples: "The therapist leads the couple through these steps in a spiral fashion, as one step incorporates and leads into the other. In mildly distressed couples, partners usually work quickly through the steps at a parallel rate. In more distressed couples, the more passive or withdrawn partner is usually invited to go through the steps slightly ahead of the other."

==== Stage 1. Stabilization (assessment and de-escalation phase) ====
- Step 1: Identify the relational conflict issues between the partners
- Step 2: Identify the negative interaction cycle where these issues are expressed
- Step 3: Access attachment emotions underlying the position each partner takes in this cycle
- Step 4: Reframe the problem in terms of the cycle, unacknowledged emotions, and attachment needs

During this stage, the therapist creates a comfortable and stable environment for the couple to have an open discussion about any hesitations the couples may have about the therapy, including the trustworthiness of the therapist. The therapist also gets a sense of the couple's positive and negative interactions from past and present and is able to summarize and present the negative patterns for them. Partners soon no longer view themselves as victims of their negative interaction cycle; they are now allies against it.

==== Stage 2. Restructuring the bond (changing interactional positions phase) ====
- Step 5: Access disowned or implicit needs (e.g., need for reassurance), emotions (e.g., shame), and models of self
- Step 6: Promote each partner's acceptance of the other's experience
- Step 7: Facilitate each partner's expression of needs and wants to restructure the interaction based on new understandings and create bonding events

This stage involves restructuring and widening the emotional experiences of the couple. This is done through couples recognizing their attachment needs and then changing their interactions based on those needs. At first, their new way of interacting may be strange and hard to accept, but as they become more aware and in control of their interactions they are able to stop old patterns of behavior from reemerging.

==== Stage 3. Integration and consolidation ====
- Step 8: Facilitate the formulation of new stories and new solutions to old problems
- Step 9: Consolidate new cycles of behavior

This stage focuses on the reflection of new emotional experiences and self-concepts. It integrates the couple's new ways of dealing with problems within themselves and in the relationship.

=== Styles of attachment ===
Johnson & Sims (2000) described four attachment styles that affect the therapy process:

1. Secure attachment: People who are secure and trusting perceive themselves as lovable, able to trust others and themselves within a relationship. They give clear emotional signals, and are engaged, resourceful and flexible in unclear relationships. Secure partners express feelings, articulate needs, and allow their own vulnerability to show.
2. Avoidant attachment: People who have a diminished ability to articulate feelings, tend not to acknowledge their need for attachment, and struggle to name their needs in a relationship. They tend to adopt a safe position and solve problems dispassionately without understanding the effect that their safe distance has on their partners.
3. Anxious attachment: People who are psychologically reactive and who exhibit anxious attachment. They tend to demand reassurance in an aggressive way, demand their partner's attachment and tend to use blame strategies (including emotional blackmail) in order to engage their partner.
4. Fearful–avoidant attachment: People who have been traumatized and have experienced little to no recovery from it vacillate between attachment and hostility. This is sometimes referred to as disorganized attachment.

== Family therapy ==
The emotionally focused family therapy (EFFT) of Johnson and her colleagues aims to promote secure bonds among distressed family members. It is a therapy approach consistent with the attachment-oriented experiential–systemic emotionally focused model in three stages: (1) de-escalating negative cycles of interaction that amplify conflict and insecure connections between parents and children; (2) restructuring interactions to shape positive cycles of parental accessibility and responsiveness to offer the child or adolescent a safe haven and a secure base; (3) consolidation of the new responsive cycles and secure bonds. Its primary focus is on strengthening parental responsiveness and care-giving, to meet children and adolescents' attachment needs. It aims to "build stronger families through (1) recruiting and strengthening parental emotional responsiveness to children, (2) accessing and clarifying children's attachment needs, and (3) facilitating and shaping care-giving interactions from parent to child". Some clinicians have integrated EFFT with play therapy.

One group of clinicians, inspired in part by Greenberg's approach to EFT, developed a treatment protocol specifically for families of individuals struggling with an eating disorder. The treatment is based on the principles and techniques of four different approaches: emotion-focused therapy, behavioral family therapy, motivational enhancement therapy, and the New Maudsley family skills-based approach. It aims to help parents "support their child in the processing of emotions, increasing their emotional self-efficacy, deepening the parent–child relationships and thereby making ED [eating disorder] symptoms unnecessary to cope with painful emotional experiences". The treatment has three main domains of intervention, four core principles, and five steps derived from Greenberg's emotion-focused approach and influenced by John Gottman: (1) attending to the child's emotional experience, (2) naming the emotions, (3) validating the emotional experience, (4) meeting the emotional need, and (5) helping the child to move through the emotional experience, problem solving if necessary.

== Efficacy ==
Johnson, Greenberg, and many of their colleagues have spent their long careers as academic researchers publishing the results of empirical studies of various forms of EFT.

The American Psychological Association considers emotion-focused therapy for individuals to be an empirically supported treatment for depression. Studies have suggested that it is effective in the treatment of depression, interpersonal problems, trauma, and avoidant personality disorder.

Practitioners of EFT have claimed that studies have consistently shown clinically significant improvement post therapy. Studies, again mostly by EFT practitioners, have suggested that emotionally focused therapy for couples is an effective way to restructure distressed couple relationships into safe and secure bonds with long-lasting results. Johnson et al. (1999) conducted a meta-analysis of the four most rigorous outcome studies before 2000 and concluded that the original nine-step, three-stage emotionally focused therapy approach to couples therapy had a larger effect size than any other couple intervention had achieved to date, but this meta-analysis was later harshly criticized by psychologist James C. Coyne, who called it "a poor quality meta-analysis of what should have been left as pilot studies conducted by promoters of a therapy in their own lab". A study with an fMRI component conducted in collaboration with American neuroscientist Jim Coan suggested that emotionally focused couples therapy reduces the brain's response to threat in the presence of a romantic partner; this study was also criticized by Coyne.

A 2019 meta-analysis on EFT effectiveness for couples therapy concluded that the approach significantly improves relationship satisfaction, with these improvements being sustained for up to two years at follow-up.

== Strengths ==
Some of the strengths of EFT approaches can be summarized as follows:

1. EFT aims to be collaborative and respectful of clients, combining experiential person-centered therapy techniques with systemic therapy interventions.
2. Change strategies and interventions are specified through intensive analysis of psychotherapy process.
3. EFT has been validated by 30 years of empirical research. There is also research on the change processes and predictors of success.
4. EFT has been applied to different kinds of problems and populations, although more research on different populations and cultural adaptations is needed.
5. EFT for couples is based on conceptualizations of marital distress and adult love that are supported by empirical research on the nature of adult interpersonal attachment.

== Criticism ==
Psychotherapist Campbell Purton, in his 2014 book The Trouble with Psychotherapy, criticized a variety of approaches to psychotherapy, including behavior therapy, person-centered therapy, psychodynamic therapy, cognitive behavioral therapy, emotion-focused therapy, and existential therapy; he argued that these psychotherapies have accumulated excessive and/or flawed theoretical baggage that deviates too much from an everyday common-sense understanding of personal troubles. With regard to emotion-focused therapy, Purton argued that "the effectiveness of each of the 'therapeutic tasks' can be understood without the theory" and that what clients say "is not well explained in terms of the interaction of emotion schemes; it is better explained in terms of the person's situation, their response to it, and their having learned the particular language in which they articulate their response."

In 2014, psychologist James C. Coyne criticized some EFT research for lack of rigor (for example, being underpowered and having high risk of bias), but he also noted that such problems are common in the field of psychotherapy research.

In a 2015 article in Behavioral and Brain Sciences on "memory reconsolidation, emotional arousal and the process of change in psychotherapy", Richard D. Lane and colleagues summarized a common claim in the literature on emotion-focused therapy that "emotional arousal is a key ingredient in therapeutic change" and that "emotional arousal is critical to psychotherapeutic success". In a response accompanying the article, Bruce Ecker and colleagues (creators of coherence therapy) disagreed with this claim and argued that the key ingredient in therapeutic change involving memory reconsolidation is not emotional arousal but instead a perceived mismatch between an expected pattern and an experienced pattern; they wrote:

The brain clearly does not require emotional arousal per se for inducing deconsolidation. That is a fundamental point. If the target learning happens to be emotional, then its reactivation (the first of the two required elements) of course entails an experience of that emotion, but the emotion itself does not inherently play a role in the mismatch that then deconsolidates the target learning, or in the new learning that then rewrites and erases the target learning (discussed at greater length in Ecker 2015). [...] The same considerations imply that "changing emotion with emotion" (stated three times by Lane et al.) inaccurately characterizes how learned responses change through reconsolidation. Mismatch consists most fundamentally of a direct, unmistakable perception that the world functions differently from one's learned model. "Changing model with mismatch" is the core phenomenology.

Other responses to Lane et al. (2015) argued that their emotion-focused approach "would be strengthened by the inclusion of predictions regarding additional factors that might influence treatment response, predictions for improving outcomes for non-responsive patients, and a discussion of how the proposed model might explain individual differences in vulnerability for mental health problems", and that their model needed further development to account for the diversity of states called "psychopathology" and the relevant maintaining and worsening processes.

== See also ==
- Accelerated experiential dynamic psychotherapy
- Affectional bond
- Attachment in adults
- Attachment in children
- Attachment-based psychotherapy
- Compassion focused therapy
- Emotional reasoning
- Emotions in decision-making
- Human bonding
- Inner Relationship Focusing
- Interpersonal attraction
- Interpersonal communication
- Intimate relationship
- Marc Brackett § RULER
- Motivated reasoning
- Object relations theory
- Schema therapy
