= Inner Relationship Focusing =

Psychotherapeutic system

Inner Relationship Focusing is a psychotherapeutic system and process developed by Ann Weiser Cornell and Barbara McGavin, as a refinement and expansion of the Focusing process discovered and developed by Eugene Gendlin in the late 1960s. Inner Relationship Focusing is a process for emotional healing, and for accessing emotional insights for forward movement in one's life.

Cornell, while a graduate student in Linguistics at the University of Chicago, met Gendlin in 1972 and learned his technique. In 1980 she began collaborating with him in teaching his Focusing workshops. Using her capacity for linguistics, Cornell helped develop the concept of Focusing guiding, and in the early 1980s she offered the first seminars on Focusing guiding. Her continuation of this process led to her development, with Barbara McGavin, of Inner Relationship Focusing.

== History ==
Inner Relationship Focusing took shape when Ann Weiser Cornell moved from Chicago to California in 1983 and began teaching Focusing to people who knew nothing about it. She discovered that many people who were not automatically adept at it needed new techniques and new language to draw out their ability to learn the process. Eventually her discoveries of what worked best for the majority of people, combined with the input, inspiration, and insights of her British collaborator Barbara McGavin, evolved into Inner Relationship Focusing in the 1990s. Cornell incorporated her new techniques and insights into her first books, The Focusing Student's Manual (1993) and The Focusing Guide's Manual (1994) – both later revised with Barbara McGavin and published in 2002 as The Focusing Student's and Companion's Manual – and in all of her subsequent books, which have become classic textbooks on Focusing.

== Description ==
Inner Relationship Focusing is a refined and expanded form of Eugene Gendlin's original six-step process of Focusing, which he had detailed in his 1978 book of the same title. Inner Relationship Focusing emphasizes being in gentle, allowing relationship with all parts of one's being, including parts that are in conflict, parts often denied or pushed away as unacceptable or demeaning, parts that are overwhelming, and parts that are so buried or subtle they need to be drawn out with patience and gentleness. In allowing all aspects of the personality to be held in acceptance and awareness, new insights and shifts can emerge and healing can occur. Inner Relationship Focusing therefore emphasizes the relationship of the Self with the various inner aspects, however painful, and it relies specifically on a quality of Presence, or the ability of the Self to be present with these aspects in a quality of friendliness, gentle curiosity, and nonjudgment. A major feature of IRF is gently finding out how a specific aspect or felt experience feels from its point of view. Another feature is giving awareness to parts of oneself that are opposing – either afraid of or objecting to – a difficult or troublesome part. Inner Relationship Focusing radically allows and accepts all parts or inner experiences. It also avoids the extremes of denial/"exile" and merging/identification/overwhelm, through using the quality of Presence to gently experience and navigate one's inner world in a calm, detached, but gently curious and inviting way.

== Differences from Gendlin's original Focusing ==
Eugene Gendlin's original Focusing process, described in his 1978 book, is a process that he generalizes as having six steps: clearing a space, allowing a "felt sense" to form, finding a handle, resonating, asking, and receiving. Inner Relationship Focusing, developed in the late 1980s through the late 1990s, is a more fluid process, and eschews or modifies certain aspects of Gendlin's. For instance, rather than clearing a space, IRF uses a mental scan of the body for what feels open and alive, and what needs acknowledging – without moving any issue "out" – in order to more fully accept or find what may be wanting attention.

Rather than "asking", the Focuser uses the quality of Presence to allow what wants to be expressed – hidden feelings, thoughts, and incipient information – to come forth. The guide, if used, gives gentle suggestions rather than asking questions in order not to intrude on the process or deflect attention away from the inner experience. This stage, which includes the stage called "resonating" in Gendlin's format, is an important and lengthy one in IRF, and includes settling down with "it" (the felt experience or the partial self), keeping it company, and sensing its point of view, including what it wants and what it does not want.

An important principle in Inner Relationship Focusing is not denying or exiling any thoughts, feelings, or partial selves – not even the inner critic – but rather empathizing with all parts and aspects and sensing what they want to communicate and why. Cornell calls this "the radical acceptance of everything". Another central principle is the aspect of Presence, or "Self-in-Presence": gentle listening, with equanimity, to everything that comes up in the Focusing process. In addition, specific language and language/thought patterns are encouraged, which Cornell calls "Presence language", in order to facilitate this process. And as indicated by its name, Inner Relationship Focusing gives high priority to the relationship of the Focuser to his inwardly felt experience or aspects of his inner life. The role of the guide, if one is used, is to support this relationship.

== Influence ==
Since the early 1990s Cornell has taught Inner Relationship Focusing throughout the U.S. at venues including Esalen, the National Institute for the Clinical Application of Behavioral Medicine, and the American Psychological Association, and also around the world. Inner Relationship Focusing is now used and taught all over the world, including in Afghanistan and Pakistan.

Psychologist and self-help author Helene Brenner calls Inner Relationship Focusing "one of the most powerful techniques I know for emotional healing". CC Leigh, whose Inseeing Process of self-healing and spiritual growth is largely based on IRF, calls Inner Relationship Focusing a "highly refined technology for getting in touch with the inner dynamics that typically lie beneath the threshold of awareness, and befriending them from a state of Presence so they can open up and organically evolve". Inner Relationship Focusing has been recommended in several 21st-century psychology textbooks, stress-reduction manuals, and other self-improvement texts, and it is the commonest adaptation of the Focusing form used today.

== See also ==
- Ego-state therapy
- Emotion-focused therapy
- Internal Family Systems Model
- Nonviolent Communication
