= Ann Weiser Cornell =

American author and educator

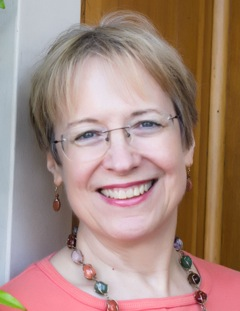
- Born: Ann Weiser; October 6, 1949 (age 77); Chicago, Illinois
- Education: PhD, Linguistics
- Alma mater: University of Chicago
- Occupations: Author, psychology educator
- Years active: 1980–present
- Known for: Focusing (psychotherapy); Inner Relationship Focusing
- Notable work: The Power of Focusing; The Focusing Student's and Companion's Manual; The Radical Acceptance of Everything; Focusing in Clinical Practice
- Title: President of the Association for Humanistic Psychology
- Predecessor: Sandra Friedman
- Successor: Arthur Warmoth
- Partner: Joseph McBride
- Relatives: Mark Weiser (brother)
- Website: FocusingResources.com

Ann Weiser Cornell (born Ann Weiser on October 6, 1949) is an American author, educator, and worldwide authority on Focusing, the self-inquiry psychotherapeutic technique developed by Eugene Gendlin. She has written several definitive books on Focusing, including The Power of Focusing: A Practical Guide to Emotional Self-Healing, The Focusing Student's and Companion's Manual, and Focusing in Clinical Practice. Cornell has taught Focusing around the world since 1980, and has developed a system and technique called Inner Relationship Focusing. She is also a past president of the Association for Humanistic Psychology.

== Education and career ==
Ann Weiser Cornell received a PhD in Linguistics in 1975 at the University of Chicago, on a Woodrow Wilson Fellowship from the National Science Foundation. She then taught Linguistics at Purdue University from 1975 to 1977.

While still a graduate student at the University of Chicago, in 1972 she met psychologist Eugene Gendlin, and learned the psychotherapeutic technique he had discovered and developed, called Focusing. After leaving her post teaching linguistics at Purdue, she moved back to Chicago and reconnected with Gendlin, and in 1980 began collaborating with him in teaching his Focusing workshops. Using her capacity for linguistics, Cornell helped develop the concept of Focusing guiding, and in the early 1980s she offered the first seminars on Focusing guiding. In the early 1980s, Cornell also trained and worked as a psychotherapist at the Chicago Counseling Center, a non-profit counseling service that grew out of the University Counseling Center operated by Carl Rogers in the 1950s.

In 1983 she moved to California – where she concentrated on training people to Focus, and on facilitating Focusing, rather than on practicing traditional psychotherapy. She began teaching her own Focusing workshops, and also experimented with how the Focusing process and theory could be expanded and refined. In 1984 she established the bi-monthly newsletter The Focusing Connection, and in 1985 she founded Focusing Resources, an umbrella organization to offer materials, support, sessions, and trainings on Focusing. In the early 1990s Cornell wrote and published the first of her Focusing books, The Focusing Student's Manual and The Focusing Guide's Manual, which were revised with Barbara McGavin in the 2000s and published as The Focusing Student's and Companion's Manual (2002).

In the early 1990s Cornell also began developing and teaching processes that emphasized the radical acceptance and allowance of all aspects, however negative, of the personality – and the ability to be present with whatever negativity comes up during Focusing – in order to return to a place of wholeness. Together with Barbara McGavin, whom she met in 1991, she developed this into a system called Inner Relationship Focusing. In the early 2000s Cornell and McGavin also developed a theory and process called Treasure Maps to the Soul, an application of Focusing to difficult areas of life, which they detailed in the book The Radical Acceptance of Everything (2005) along with Inner Relationship Focusing. In 2024 Cornell and McGavin released Untangling: How You Can Transform What’s Impossibly Stuck another book in their series of transformative stories.

== Books and trainings ==
Cornell's books, including the best-selling The Power of Focusing (1996) which expanded and developed Gendlin's original Focusing processes further, The Focusing Student's and Companion's Manual (2002), The Radical Acceptance of Everything (2005), and Focusing in Clinical Practice (2013), have been translated into several languages. She has taught Focusing all over the world, and she is also one of the premier trainers of Focusing teachers. Through her organization, Focusing Resources, she offers teleseminars, workshops, Focusing sessions, audio and print materials including The Focusing Teacher's Manual (2008), and free resources on Focusing.

== Personal life ==
Cornell lives in Berkeley, California. Her partner is author and film historian Joseph McBride. She is the sister of computer scientist Mark Weiser (1952–1999).

== Selected bibliography ==
- The Power of Focusing: A Practical Guide to Emotional Self-Healing. New Harbinger Publications, 1996.
- The Focusing Student's and Companion's Manual, Parts One and Two. Calluna Press, 2002. (with Barbara McGavin)
- The Radical Acceptance of Everything: Living a Focusing Life. Calluna Press, 2005. (with Barbara McGavin)
- Focusing in Clinical Practice: The Essence of Change. W. W. Norton & Company, 2013.

== Selected audio ==
- Focusing, Psychotherapy and the Implicit, a 5-week course on CDs with Eugene Gendlin and Ann Weiser Cornell
- Learning Focusing, a two-CD set by Ann Weiser Cornell
- Releasing Blocks to Action, a five-week course CD set by Ann Weiser Cornell
