= Inner critic =

Concept in psychology

The inner critic or critical inner voice is a concept used in popular psychology and psychotherapy to refer to a subpersonality that judges and demeans a person.

A concept similar in many ways to the Freudian superego as inhibiting censor, the inner critic is usually experienced as an inner voice judging a person, saying that the person is bad, wrong, inadequate, worthless, guilty, and so on.

== Characteristics ==
The inner critic often produces feelings of shame, deficiency, low self-esteem, and depression. It may also cause self-doubt and undermine self-confidence. It is common for people to have a harsh inner critic that is debilitating.

Neville Symington suggested that such a severely critical inner object is especially noticeable in narcissism.

Jay Earley and Bonnie Weiss have labeled seven types of inner critics—the perfectionist, the taskmaster, the inner controller, the guilt tripper, the destroyer, the underminer, and the molder.

== Self-help ==
A number of self-help books deal with the inner critic, though some use other terms to denote it, such as "the judge" or "the gremlin". There are two main approaches to working with the inner critic:

1. Treat it as an enemy to be ignored, dismissed, fought against, or overcome. This is the approach recommended by Byron Brown based on the Diamond Approach, by Robert W. Firestone and colleagues in their Voice Therapy approach, and by Rick Carson in his book Taming Your Gremlin.
2. Treat it as an ally to be befriended and transformed. This is the approach recommended by Hal and Sidra Stone based on Voice Dialogue, by Earley and Weiss based on Internal Family Systems therapy, by Ann Weiser Cornell based on Inner Relationship Focusing, and by Tsultrim Allione based on Tibetan Buddhism. Pat Allen also takes this approach in her book Art Is a Way of Knowing, as does Lucy Bellwood in 100 Demon Dialogues. These approaches see the inner critic as attempting to help or protect the person—but in a covert, distorted, or maladaptive way. This perspective makes it possible to connect with the critic and transform it over time into a helpful ally.

Some psychotherapists suggest that either of these two approaches may be appropriate depending on how the inner critic manifests. If the inner critic is intense and stubborn, a friendly approach of valorizing the inner critic's concerns could be helpful; if the inner critic is mild, it may be more appropriate to gently ignore it and make contact with "suppressed organismic experience".

Robert W. Firestone and Lisa Firestone, in their book Conquer Your Critical Inner Voice, discuss how the inner voice often seems to protect a person from being hurt or feeling abandoned when in reality it reinforces feelings of shame and guilt, sabotages intimate relationships, and leads to self-destructive behaviors. Their book presents a method for externalizing the critical inner voice in order to turn self-criticisms into statements that can be evaluated objectively.

Meditation or mindfulness practice is considered one effective strategy for dealing with the negative effects of critical thoughts.

== Literary examples ==
- Virginia Woolf considered all books as "surrounded by a circle of invisible censors ... [who] admonish us". She named one major figure "The Angel in the House", a female voice telling her to be less hostile to/placate men; another "The Spirit of the Age", an elderly male voice like a customs officer checking her writing for contraband.

== See also ==
- Association of ideas
- Autocommunication
- Compassion focused therapy
- Default mode network
- Impostor syndrome
- Internal discourse
- Internal monologue
- Introspection
- Mind-wandering
- Personification
- Psychology of self § Berne's transactional analysis (Critical parent)
- Resistance (creativity)
- Stream of consciousness
- Superego resistance
- Train of thought
