= Victor Fuchs =

American health economist (1924–2023)

Victor R. Fuchs
- Born: Victor Robert Fuchs; January 31, 1924; New York City, U.S.
- Died: September 16, 2023 (aged 99); Palo Alto, California, U.S.
- Spouse: Beverly Beck (m. 1948; died 2007)
- Children: 2
- Relatives: Lawrence Fuchs (brother)

Academic background
- Education: New York University (B.S.); Columbia University (M.A., Ph.D.)
- Thesis: The Economics of the Fur Industry: A Study of a Highly Competitive Industry in a Less Competitive Economy (1955)
- Doctoral advisors: Frederick C. Mills; George J. Stigler

Academic work
- Discipline: Health economics
- Institutions: Columbia University; New York University; CUNY Graduate Center; NBER; Stanford University

Victor Robert Fuchs (January 31, 1924 – September 16, 2023) was an American health economist and a pioneer of the field. He was known for his 1975 book Who Shall Live?, which detailed the consequences of rising health care costs in the United States.

== Early life and education ==
Fuchs was born in the Bronx. His parents were Austrian-Jewish immigrants. His father Alfred Fuchs was a businessman in the fur industry. His younger brother, Lawrence Fuchs, went on to be a professor of American studies at Brandeis University.

Fuchs served in the U.S. Army during World War II, and studied business administration as an undergraduate at New York University. He initially worked at his father's business as a fur salesman, before going back to school, attaining a PhD in economics from Columbia University in 1955. His thesis was supervised by Frederick C. Mills and George J. Stigler.

== Career ==
Fuchs started teaching at Columbia University in 1953 while still a graduate student. He became an assistant professor in economics there after graduation and stayed until 1959. He was an associate professor in economics at New York University from 1959 to 1960. From 1968 to 1974, Fuchs was a professor of economics at the City University of New York Graduate Center. He joined Stanford University in 1974 and became a professor of economics in the department of economics and the department of health research and policy. He was a research associate at the National Bureau of Economic Research and was the co-director of the FRESH-Thinking Project and CASBS at Stanford University. He was elected to the American Academy of Arts and Sciences in 1982 and to the American Philosophical Society in 1990. In 1995, the same year he took emeritus status at Stanford, he served as president of the American Economic Association. In 2001, he was recipient of the John R. Commons Award, given by the economics honor society Omicron Delta Epsilon.

In 1975, Fuchs published the book Who Shall Live? Health, Economics, and Social Choice, which discussed the increasing expenses on healthcare in the United States, and how it does not correlate with better overall health. The New York Times said it became "required reading among physicians, health economists and anyone interested in the knotty issue of American health care". He updated the book through the rest of his life, with the last edition he worked on set for publication in October 2023, the month after his death.

=== Relative poverty rate ===
Fuchs is credited with introducing the relative poverty rate, calculated as the fraction of members of a society earning less than 50% of the median income.

=== Comparison of healthcare in Canada and US ===
In 1990 Fuchs published a paper together with James S. Hahn, entitled How Does Canada Do it? – A comparison of Expenditures for Physicians' Services in the United States and Canada. It discusses the differences in the Canadian and US healthcare spending patterns and also discusses why healthcare expenditures are so much higher in the United States. Fuchs and Hahn found that the higher US expenditures were entirely based on 234 percent higher fees for services than Canada even though there are more physicians per capita in Canada. That shows that the typical view of Canada saving money by delivering fewer services is false and that the insurance setup, being a single-payer system, is what gives it the edge.

Differences between the United States and Canada on fees, spending, and use are shown. The accentuating difference begins with the disparity in health care coverage. Canada operates under a universal health care system, which covers majority of their residents. On the other hand, the United States operates under a fragmented multi-payer system that fails to provide coverage for many Americans. Moreover, the lack of correspondence between both countries regarding health care coverage validates part of the narrative reported in the study, which concluded that the US spent more on physicians' services than Canada.

Furthermore, the study also suggests that higher expenditures in the US is a function of many factors including higher wages earned by US physicians, the difference of physicians on demand, billing costs, quality of health care, physicians' workload, and superfluous amenities. Notably, the factors bring to question the underlying differences in health care delivery, and the authors reported more general practitioners in Canada per capita. The limited role of general practitioners in the US compared to Canada may imply that Canadian physicians are "more inclined to recommend additional evaluation and management services."

== Personal life and death ==
Fuchs was married to the former Beverly Beck from 1948 until her death in 2007; they had two sons. He died at his home in Palo Alto, California, on Stanford's campus, on September 16, 2023, at the age of 99.

== Published books ==
- Fuchs, Victor R. (1957). The Economics of the Fur Industry. Columbia Studies in the Social Sciences. New York, NY: Columbia University Press. doi:10.7312/fuch93396. ISBN 978-0-231-93396-4.
- Warner, Aaron W.; Fuchs, Victor R. (1958). Concepts and Cases in Economic Analysis. Harcourt, Brace.
- Fuchs, Victor (1962). Changes in the Location of Manufacturing in the United States Since 1929. Yale University Press. ISBN 978-0-300-00470-0.
- Fuchs, Victor R. (1969). Production and Productivity in the Service Industries. Columbia University Press. ISBN 978-0-87014-489-9. OCLC 234221150.
- Fuchs, Victor R., ed. (1972). Essays in the economics of health and medical care. Human behavior and social institutions. New York: National Bureau of Economic Research; distributed by Columbia University Press. ISBN 978-0-87014-236-9.
- Fuchs, Victor R. (1975). Who shall live? Health, economics, and social choice. New York: Basic Books. ISBN 978-0-465-09185-0.
  - Fuchs, Victor R. (2011). Who shall live? health, economics, and social choice (2nd ed.). New Jersey: World Scientific. ISBN 978-981-4354-87-5.
  - Fuchs, Victor R.; Eggleston, Karen (2024). Who shall live? health, economics and social choice (3rd ed.). New Jersey: World Scientific. ISBN 978-981-12-6850-2.
- Fuchs, Victor R., ed. (1982). Economic Aspects of Health. NBER-Conference Report. Chicago: University of Chicago Press. ISBN 978-0-226-26794-4.
- Fuchs, Victor R. (1983). How we live: an economic perspective on Americans from birth to death. Cambridge, Mass.: Harvard University Press. ISBN 978-0-674-41226-2.
- Fuchs, Victor R. (1986). The health economy. Cambridge, Mass: Harvard University Press. ISBN 978-0-674-38340-1.
- Fuchs, Victor R. (1990). Women's Quest for Economic Equality. Harvard University Press. ISBN 978-0-674-95546-2.
- Fuchs, Victor R. (1993). The future of health policy. Cambridge, Mass.: Harvard Univ. Press. ISBN 978-0-674-33826-5.
- Fuchs, Victor R., ed. (1996). Individual and social responsibility: child care, education, medical care, and long-term care in America. A National Bureau of Economic Research Conference report. Chicago: University of Chicago Press. ISBN 978-0-226-26786-9.
- Fuchs, Victor R. (2018). Health economics and policy: selected writings by Victor Fuchs. Singapore: World Scientific Publishing Co. Pte Ltd. ISBN 978-981-323-287-7.
