= Hidden personality =

Hidden personality is the part of the personality that is determined by unconscious processes.

== Sigmund Freud ==
The basic assumption of Freud's psychoanalytic view of the person is an energy system in which all mental processes are considered to be energy flows, which can flow freely or can get sidetracked or dammed up. Freud argues that the goal of all behaviour is the reduction of tension through the release of energy, which produces pleasure. People function in accordance with hedonistic principles, seeking unbridled gratification of all desires. The endless pursuit of pleasure is, however, in conflict with society and civilization, as the uncontrolled satisfaction of pleasure is not accepted. In Freud's view, humans are primarily driven by sexual and aggressive instincts. Sexual and aggressive energy prevented from expression in a more direct way are converted to cultural activities such as art and science. Energy used for cultural purposes is, however, no longer available to sexual purposes and Freud concludes that the price of civilization is misery, the forfeit of happiness and a sense of guilt.

Freud's theory of personality is based on the idea that much of human behaviour is determined by forces outside awareness. The relation between the person and society is controlled by primitive urges buried deep within ourselves, forming the basis of the hidden self. Freud argues that much of our psychic energy is devoted either to finding acceptable expressions of unconscious ideas or to keeping them unconscious. Freud constructed his concept of the unconscious from analysis of slips of the tongue, dreams, neuroses, psychoses, works of art and rituals. In psychoanalytic theory, mental life is divided into three levels of awareness. The largest portion of the mind is formed by the unconscious system and only a very small part by the conscious. The preconscious-system stands like a partition screen between the unconscious-system and consciousness. The conscious mind is like the tip of an iceberg, with its greatest part – the unconscious – submerged. Psychoanalytic theory is fundamentally a motivational theory of human behaviour and Freud claimed that "psychoanalysis aims at and achieves nothing more than the discovery of the unconscious in mental life".

== Carl Rogers ==
Humanist psychologist Carl Rogers opposed psychoanalytic personality theory as he was dissatisfied with the 'dehumanising nature' of this school of thought. The central tenet of humanistic psychology is that people have drives that lead them to engage in activities resulting in personal satisfaction and a contribution to society: the actualising tendency. This tendency is present in all organisms and can be defined as the motivation present in every life form to develop its potentials to the fullest extent. Humanistic psychology is based on an optimistic view of human nature and the direction of people's movement is basically towards self-actualisation. Some might criticise Rogers as being a naive optimist and point out the violent history of humanity. Rogers defends his view by referring to the fact that his theory is based on more than twenty-five years of experience in psychotherapy.

A person's identity is formed through a series of personal experiences, which reflect how the individual is perceived by both him or herself and the outside world – the phenomenological field. Individuals also have experiences of which they are unaware and the phenomenological field contains both conscious and unconscious perceptions. The concept of the self is, according to Rogers, however, primarily conscious. The most important determinants of behaviour are those that are conscious or are capable of becoming conscious. Rogers argues that a notion of the self that includes a reference to the unconscious (as with Freud) cannot be studied objectively as it can not be directly known.

Rogerian personality theory distinguishes between two personalities. The real self is created through the actualising tendency, it is the self that one can become. The demands of society, however, do not always support the actualising tendency and we are forced to live under conditions that are out of step with our tendencies. The ideal self is the ideal created through the demands of society. Rogers does not see it as something to strive for (that is the real self) but an ideal imposed on us we can never fully reach. Rogers' view of 'hidden' personality relates to the person one could be given the right circumstances within society. For an individual to be truly happy and for self-actualisation to be realised, the public and hidden selves must be as similar as possible. Rogers believed that when all aspects of a person's life, surroundings and thoughts are in harmony, thus the ideal state of congruence is reached.

== Carl Jung ==
Jung was a Swiss psychiatrist who became one of the most famous and influential psychological thinkers and innovators of all time. Early in his career, Jung studied with Sigmund Freud and was thought to possibly succeed Freud as the leading promoter of Freud's brand of psychoanalysis. Later in his career Jung's thinking diverged significantly from Freudian psychology in ways that are directly relevant to the concept of the inferior function. Jung viewed human personality from a broad perspective, so his system for understanding individual differences and similarities is complex. Jung saw the human psyche as containing everything necessary to grow, adapt, and heal itself. He believed that people were capable of directing their own personality development and benefiting from both positive and negative life experiences (Quenk 2002).

In his studies, Carl Jung divided the psyche into the unconscious and the conscious minds. Freud viewed the unconscious as containing the Id, the Superego and the Ego, whereas Jung developed a different model. He described the unconscious as consisting of two major components: the Personal Unconscious and the Collective Unconscious (Quenk 2002).

Jung looked at all behavior including neurotic symptoms as ways of stimulating an individual's growth toward completion. He was interested in personality development as it occurred over the life span and saw it as an ongoing process.

=== Personal Unconscious ===
The Personal Unconscious, as conceived by Jung, encompasses the totality of what Freud recognized as "the unconscious" and corresponds to what most of us intuitively associate with the term "unconscious mind." It contains those elements of our own unique life experience which have been forgotten, ignored, repressed, suppressed or otherwise blocked from consciousness. Some of these elements can be easily recalled into consciousness at will, while others may be more difficult to access or retrieve. In simpler terms, the Personal Unconscious are the thoughts, ideas, emotions, and other mental phenomena acquired and repressed during one's lifetime.

=== The Collective Unconscious ===
Many philosophers have advanced the theory that the human mind is a "blank slate," capable of being molded by our upbringing, which includes social experiences. In working with patients, Carl Jung observed the development of repeated themes in different people's artwork, dreams and fantasies. Yet he noticed that many of these themes had no relation to and could not have originated from any connection to the person's own individual life experiences.

Jung concluded that, in addition to our Personal Unconscious, we each possess a deeper aspect of the unconscious. It was in identifying this second unconscious region that Jung's model differentiated itself from Freud's. Naming it the Collective Unconscious, Jung theorized that this region contained psychological elements not developed during the course of our own lives, but passed on through our common evolutionary history to all members of our species. There are shared, fundamental elements that make up the Collective Unconscious and generate a limiting framework around which our psychic material organizes. He referred to those as Archetypes. Archetypes are the fundamental elements of the collective unconscious. Jung, states that every human being is born with a psyche that expects to engage, influence, and to undergo certain life milestones. For instance, our psyches have evolved to expect us to be born, to expect us to have parents, to expect us to encounter particular types of other people and creatures with which we share the earth, to expect us to have children, and to expect us to eventually die. These fundamental psychological expectations have become embodied, Jung claimed, in a common set of basic tendencies in the unconscious that predispose us to generate particular ideas, concepts and imagery related to them. These tendencies are the Archetypes.

== Foundations of Personality ==
Freud and Roger's theory of personality are based on some very different assumptions. Their concept of human nature and the role of rationality in human motivation are diametrically opposed. Although both theories include a hidden personality, both concepts are very different in that for Freud it is our natural state, while for Rogers it is the self-created by the demands of society.

=== Human Nature ===
Freud theorised that people have an unconscious mind that would, if permitted, manifest itself in incest, murder and other activities which are considered crimes in contemporary society. Freud believes that neuroticism is a result of tensions caused by suppression of our unconscious drives, which are fundamentally aggressive towards others.

Rogers agrees that we may behave aggressive and violent at times, but at such times we are neurotic and are not functioning as fully developed human beings. Rogers reverses Freud's concept of neuroticism and thinks that what Freud has construed as our natural state of being is actually unnatural and unhealthy behaviour. For Rogers, the core of our nature is essentially positive and aligned towards self-actualisation, while for Freud, we solely are driven by sexual and aggressive instincts. Recent research support Rogers' point of view as it has shown that people with an optimistic style of thought tend to cope more effectively with stress than do people who have a pessimistic style.

=== Reason in Human Behaviour ===
Revolutions in the history of science have one common feature: they deconstruct our convictions about our own self-importance. Copernicus moved our home from centre of the universe to its periphery, Darwin relegated us to descent from an animal world and Freud discovered the unconscious and deconstructed the myth of a fully rational mind. In Freud's view, human beings are basically irrational and the unconscious mind is alogical. We are forever driven by irrational, practically uncontrollable unconscious instincts that are the ultimate cause of all activity.

Rogers sees human beings as basically rational and behaviour is controlled through reason. Rationality and the actualising tendency are inseparably connected in Rogers' basic image of personality. Human behaviour is, according to Rogers: "exquisitely rational, moving with subtle and ordered complexity toward the goals the organism is endeavouring to achieve". The natural course of the actualising tendency is, however, often blocked by psychosocial conditions. When this happens, people become estranged from their true nature and may behave irrationally through anti-social and destructive behaviour.

=== Hidden Personalities ===
The Freudian concept of the unconscious mind was never experimentally verified by him and remained a theoretical construct. Critical questions about what is available to immediate observation and what occurs unconsciously could never be fully answered by Freud as he did not possess any of the current day technological possibilities. Through contemporary cognitive science, it has been discovered that most of our thought actually is unconscious, not in the Freudian sense of being repressed, but in the sense that it operates beneath the level of cognitive awareness, inaccessible to consciousness and operating too fast to focus on.

Unconscious processing goes on in the mind of humans, not because we have to filter out threatening stimuli and impulses, but because many cognitive operations go on without conscious participation. The brain operates in this way in order not to flood the conscious part of the mind with impressions. The unconscious is a type of process, a way of constructing perception, memories and other kinds of cognition, not a portion of the mind. This view agrees with Roger's concept of the unconscious, who theorised that the unconscious is only a part of the phenomenological field and does not control our personality.

Aside from Freud and Roger's views on the hidden personality there is a simplified idea of stress. When our hidden personality emerges it is also referred to as out-of-character episodes. These are essential to our general well-being as well as helping to continue our own personal growth and development. When a hidden personality emerges it's also called being 'in the grip'. This refers to the times when the inferior function is being showcased. This happens when we are low on energy and under great stress. Stress is defined as any external or internal event that lessens or depletes one's mental and physical well being. Stress is a necessary and sufficient stimulus for bringing out our hidden personality. Unconscious contents are charged with energy that must be discharged in order for a person to function comfortably and with minimal tension and distress. One of the most powerful and universal ways human beings deal with being unacknowledged, unconscious thoughts and feelings is through projection. Because the inferior function is appropriately understood as an unconscious process that is subject to the mechanism of projection. Projection involves attributing to others an unacknowledged, unconscious part of ourselves- something that lies outside our conscious awareness. What we project onto others can be negative or it can be positive. In Jung's psychology, projection often accounts for our initial attraction to or rejection of others. A person may be a ready "host" for one or more aspects of our own unconscious, and it's a way our psyche regulates itself. Equilibrium is maintained when people eliminate their contradictory ideas or feelings (Quenk 2002).

We are all capable of using our tertiary and inferior functions when a particular task requires them.

Jung suggested that we all have instincts that pushes us to grow toward completion, or to become the best possible version of ourselves. This goal is called individualization, a state of self-awareness or self-actualization we strive for and hardly ever achieve. Jung saw the lifelong quest of individualism as more important than focusing on an unattainable end point.
