= Natalie Rogers =

American psychologist (1928–2015)

- Born: 1928
- Died: 2015 (aged 86–87)
- Occupations: expressive therapies, Humanistic psychology, person-centered therapy
- Known for: Founder of Person-Centered Expressive Arts
- Notable work: The Creative Connection: Expressive Arts as Healing (book) Emerging Woman: A Decade of Midlife Transitions (book)
- Parent: Carl Rogers

Natalie Rogers (1928–2015) was an early contributor to the field of humanistic psychology, person centered psychology, expressive arts therapy, and the founder of Person-Centered Expressive Arts. This combination of the arts with psychotherapy is sometimes referred to by Rogers as The Creative Connection. The daughter of Carl Rogers, one of the founders of humanistic psychology, she established her own center, the Person-Centered Expressive Therapy Institute. Her writings, teachings, and practice introduced many to the power of creative arts for healing both within and outside the therapeutic setting.

== Early life and education ==
Natalie Rogers was born to psychologist Carl Rogers and Helen Elliot, a talented artist. She was raised alongside her brother David and describes growing up in a house that encouraged pursuits of creativity. She attended private schooling as a child, growing up mostly in New York and Ohio. At the age of twenty-one, she married scholar Lawrence Fuchs with whom she had three daughters. Early in her career she worked in a psychiatric clinic, as a therapist with children, and at a college counseling center before entering private practice. In 1970, she divorced Fuchs and moved to California to establish her own therapeutic practice. Her book Emerging Woman describes her journey through womanhood.

== Career ==
Rogers' Person-Centered Expressive Arts therapy involves incorporating multiple forms of expression beyond traditional art to include movement and psychodrama. As a professor at Saybrook University, her work in developing expressive arts therapy expanded upon traditional views of art therapy as pertaining to drawing, painting, and sculpture to include other modalities of art including dance, movement, poetry and drama into the therapeutic process. She provided training for therapists in person-centered expressive arts therapy at multiple institutes, including her own, over the course of twenty years.

=== Person-centered expressive arts therapy ===
Practitioners of Person-Centered Expressive Arts therapy describe using the expressive arts to help clients approach both their conscious and unconscious to promote healing and growth. The role of the therapist is to provide a caring and positive attitude toward the client and help the client work through negative feelings through the process. Like other humanistic therapeutic approaches, the therapist shows unconditional positive regard to the client. Expressive Arts workshops involve participating in the process that Natalie Rogers described as The Creative Connection. This combines multiple forms of self-expression with an end goal of achieving new levels of personal development. The person-centered aspect of the therapy refers to the role of the therapist in creating a safe environment for clients to engage in symbolic expression through the arts. The therapist listens without judgment or criticism and creates a space for further self-exploration and encourages the client to engage in stimulating or challenging experiences.

=== Encounter groups ===
In the 1970s, Natalie Rogers, assisted her father in leading Person-Centered encounter groups. Encounter groups are described as large workshops of eighty (80) to one hundred and fifty (150) people with a goal of not just personal growth but larger social transformation. These groups aimed to apply person-centered techniques beyond one-on-one therapeutic scenarios to large group settings. Person-Centered Approach (PCA) Encounter groups involved a great deal of pre-planning and facilitation by carefully selected staff. These workshops were conducted in several countries and sometimes sought to address larger social and political issues of the time.

== Selected works ==
- The Creative Connection for Groups (2011)]
- The Creative Connection: Expressive Arts as Healing (1993)
- Emerging Woman: A Decade of Midlife Transitions (1980)

== Awards and recognitions ==
- Rogers was recognized with a Lifetime Achievement award in 1993 from the International Expressive Arts Therapy Association
- Carl Rogers Award from the Society for Humanistic Psychology (Division 32 of the American Psychological Association) in 2015
  - This award is "given to an individual for an outstanding contribution to the theory and practice of humanistic psychology," with other recipients including E. Mark Stern and Jules Seeman.
