= Jay Earley =

American computer scientist and psychologist

Jay Earley is an American computer scientist and psychologist. He invented the Earley parser in his early career in computer science. Later he became a clinical psychologist specializing in group therapy and Internal Family Systems Therapy (IFS), including working with the inner critic. He has created the Pattern System, a personality system, and Self-Therapy Journey, a web application for psychological healing and behavior change.
