= Lawrence Fuchs =

American scholar (1927–2013)

- Born: January 29, 1927; New York City, U.S.
- Died: March 17, 2013 (aged 86); Canton, Massachusetts, U.S.
- Education: New York University, Harvard University
- Known for: American immigration law
- Spouses: Natalie Rogers (m. 1950; div. 1970); Betty Corcoran Fuchs (m. 1970; died 2012)
- Children: 7 (including 4 stepchildren)
- Relatives: Victor Fuchs (brother)
- Scientific career
- Fields: American studies
- Workplaces: Brandeis University, Peace Corps, Carter administration
- Thesis: (1955)

Lawrence Howard Fuchs (January 29, 1927 – March 17, 2013) was an American academic and author. He was a scholar of American studies and an expert on immigration policy who founded the American studies department at Brandeis University, where he was the Meyer and Walter Jaffe Professor of American Civilization and Politics.

== Early career ==
Fuchs was born in The Bronx in 1927, the son of Jewish immigrants from Austria. His brother, Victor, went on to be a prominent health economist.

Fuchs served in the U.S. Navy during World War II as a medic. He began teaching at Harvard University in 1952 before finishing his doctorate there in 1955. He then began teaching at Brandeis in 1955.

== Teaching at Brandeis ==
Fuchs founded the American Studies department at Brandeis in 1970. He chaired the department for 25 years. Among his courses was a seminar on American politics that he co-taught with Eleanor Roosevelt, who was a visiting professor at the time.

== Outside the university ==
From 1961 until 1963, Fuchs was the first Peace Corps director in the Philippines. He later wrote a book, Those Peculiar Americans: The Peace Corps and American National Character, about his experiences with the Peace Corps. Fuchs later founded the Commonwealth Service Corps in Massachusetts, a domestic service organization similar to the Peace Corps.

In 1979, Fuchs worked as the executive director of the Select Commission on Immigration and Refugee Policy in the Carter administration. His efforts led to signing and passage of the Immigration Reform and Control Act of 1986, and later the Immigration Act of 1990. The Immigration Reform and Control Act of 1986 was the first major U.S. immigration reform enacted since 1965 and was signed into law by President Ronald Reagan. In 1990 Fuchs served as vice chairman of the United States Commission on Immigration Reform, a congressional advisory board. In 1997, the commission recommended increased policing of employers that hire illegal immigrants: a proposal that as of 2013 continues to be contested.

== Personal ==
Fuchs married Natalie Rogers in 1950. They had three daughters together. Their marriage ended in divorce in 1970. That same year, Fuchs married Betty Corcoran Fuchs, who had one daughter and three sons from a previous marriage. Betty Fuchs died in 2012.

Fuchs died from Parkinson's disease at his home in Canton, Massachusetts, on March 17, 2013, at the age of 86.

== Partial bibliography ==
Fuchs wrote over 10 books, The American Kaleidoscope being his seminal work.

=== Books ===
- Political Behavior of American Jews (1956)
- Hawaii Pono: A Social History (1961)
- John F. Kennedy and American Catholicism (1967)
- Those Peculiar Americans: The Peace Corps and American National Character (1968)
- American Ethnic Politics (1968)
- Family Matters: Why the American Family is in Trouble (1973)
- Black in White America, principal scholar (1974)
- The American Experiment, principal scholar (1981)
- The American Kaleidoscope: Race, Ethnicity, and the Civic Culture (1991)
- Hawaii Pono = Hawaii the Excellent: An Ethnic and Political History (1992)
- Beyond Patriarchy: Jewish Fathers and Families (2000).

=== Co-authored works ===
- Should United States Immigration Policy be Changed? AEI forums monograph, with Michael Novak (1987)

=== Journal articles and additional publications ===
- Trends and pressures in contemporary Jewish family life (1978)
- When to Count by Race: Affirmative Action, Quotas and Equal Opportunity (1986)
