= Focusing (psychotherapy) =

Psychotherapeutic technique

Focusing is an internally oriented psychotherapeutic process developed by psychotherapist Eugene Gendlin. It can be used in any kind of therapeutic situation, including peer-to-peer sessions. It involves holding a specific kind of open, non-judging attention to an internal knowing which is experienced but is not yet in words. Focusing can, among other things, be used to become clear on what one feels or wants, to obtain new insights about one's situation, and to stimulate change or healing of the situation. Focusing is set apart from other methods of inner awareness by three qualities: something called the "felt sense", a quality of engaged accepting attention, and a research-based technique that facilitates change.

== Origin ==
At the University of Chicago, beginning in 1953, Eugene Gendlin did 15 years of research analyzing what made psychotherapy either successful or unsuccessful. His conclusion was that it is not the therapist's technique that determines the success of psychotherapy, but rather the way the patient behaves, and what the patient does inside himself during the therapy sessions. Gendlin found that, without exception, the successful patient intuitively focuses inside himself on a very subtle and vague internal bodily awareness—or "felt sense"—which contains information that, if attended to or focused on, holds the key to the resolution of the problems the patient is experiencing.

"Focusing" is a process and learnable skill developed by Gendlin which re-creates this successful-patient behavior in a form that can be taught to other patients. Gendlin detailed the techniques in his book Focusing which, intended for the layperson, is written in conversational terms and describes the six steps of Focusing and how to do them. Gendlin stated: "I did not invent Focusing. I simply made some steps which help people to find Focusing."

== "Felt sense" and "felt shift" ==
Gendlin gave the name "felt sense" to the unclear, pre-verbal sense of "something"—the inner knowledge or awareness that has not been consciously thought or verbalized—as that "something" is experienced in the body. It is not the same as an emotion. This bodily felt "something" may be an awareness of a situation or an old hurt, or of something that is "coming"—perhaps an idea or insight. Crucial to the concept, as defined by Gendlin, is that it is unclear and vague, and it is always more than any attempt to express it verbally. Gendlin also described it as "sensing an implicit complexity, a wholistic sense of what one is working on".

According to Gendlin, the Focusing process makes a felt sense more tangible and easier to work with. To help the felt sense form and to accurately identify its meaning, the focuser tries out words that might express it. These words can be tested against the felt sense: The felt sense will not resonate with a word or phrase that does not adequately describe it.

Gendlin observed clients, writers, and people in ordinary life ("Focusers") turning their attention to this not-yet-articulated knowing. As a felt sense formed, there would be long pauses together with sounds like "uh...." Once the person had accurately identified this felt sense in words, new words would come, and new insights into the situation. There would be a sense of felt movement—a "felt shift"—and the person would begin to be able to move beyond the "stuck" place, having fresh insights, and also sometimes indications of steps to take.

== Learning and using Focusing ==
One can learn the Focusing technique from one of several books, or from a Focusing trainer, practitioner, or therapist. Focusing is easiest to sense and do in the presence of a "listener"—either a Focusing trainer, a therapist, or a layperson trained in Focusing. However, the practice can be done alone. Gendlin's book details the six steps of Focusing, however it emphasizes that the essence of Focusing is not adhering to these steps, but following the organic process. When the person learns the basics, they are able to weave through the process increasingly more and more organically.

Focusing is now practiced all over the world by thousands of people—both in professional settings with Focusing trainers, and informally between laypersons. As a stand-alone process, a Focusing session can last from approximately 10 minutes to an hour, on average—with the "focuser" being listened to, and their verbalized thoughts and feelings being reflected back by the "listener". Generally speaking, but not always, the focuser has their eyes closed, in order to more accurately focus inwardly on their "felt sense" and the shifts that take place from it.

== Subsequent developments ==
In 1996, Gendlin published a comprehensive book on Focusing-oriented psychotherapy. The Focusing-oriented psychotherapist attributes a central importance to the client's capacity to be aware of their "felt sense" and the meaning behind their words or images. The client is encouraged to sense into feelings and meanings which are not yet formed. Other elements of Focusing are also incorporated into the therapy practice so that Focusing remains the basis of the process—allowing for inner resonance and verification of ideas and feelings, and allowing new and fresh insights to come from within the client.

Several adaptations of Gendlin's original six-step Focusing process have been developed. The most popular and prevalent of these is the process Ann Weiser Cornell teaches, called Inner Relationship Focusing.

Other developments in Focusing include focusing alone using a journal or a sketchbook. Drawing and painting can be used with Focusing processes with children. Focusing also happens in other domains besides therapy. Attention to the felt sense naturally takes place in all manner of processes where something new is being formed: for example in creative process, learning, thinking, and decision making.

== See also ==
- Emotion-focused therapy
- Internal Family Systems Model
- Intuition (mind)
- Method of levels
- Nonviolent Communication
