= Frederick C. Mills =

American economist (1892–1964)

- Born: March 24, 1892; Santa Rosa, California, US
- Died: February 9, 1964 (aged 71); Neshanic, New Jersey, US

Academic background
- Education: Columbia University; University of California, Berkeley
- Doctoral advisor: Wesley Clair Mitchell

Academic work
- Discipline: Macroeconomics
- School or tradition: Institutionalism
- Institutions: Columbia University

Frederick Cecil Mills (March 24, 1892 – February 9, 1964) was an American economist. He was a professor of economics at Columbia University in Manhattan from 1919 to 1959. An expert on business cycles, he was also a researcher at the National Bureau of Economic Research from 1925 to 1953. In 1940, he served as president of the American Economic Association. Mills was named a Fellow of the American Statistical Association in 1926.

His son, Robert Mills, was a physicist known for the development of Yang–Mills theory.

== Bibliography ==
- Raymond Taylor Bye; Frederick Cecil Mills (1940). An Appraisal of Frederick C. Mills' The Behavior of Prices. Social Science Research Council.
- Frederick Cecil Mills (1924). Statistical Methods, applied to Economics and Business. Henry Holt.
- Frederick Cecil Mills (1917). Contemporary Theories of Unemployment and Unemployment Relief. Columbia University.
