= Carl Rogers =

American psychologist (1902–1987)

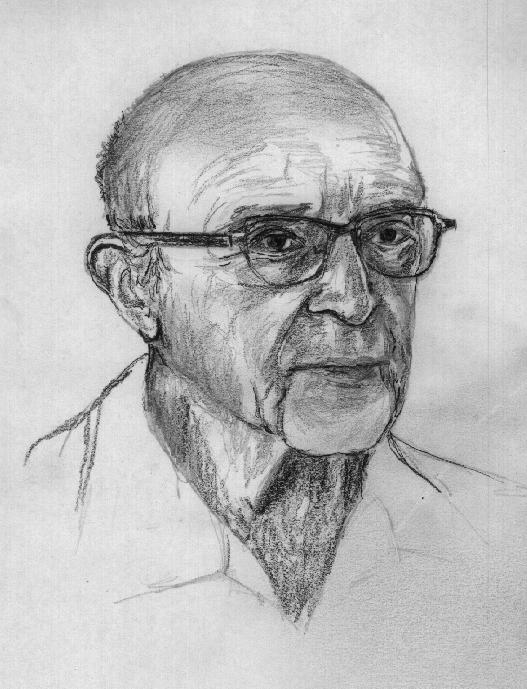
- Born: Carl Ransom Rogers; January 8, 1902; Oak Park, Illinois, U.S.
- Died: February 4, 1987 (aged 85); San Diego, California, U.S.
- Education: University of Wisconsin–Madison (BA); Union Theological Seminary; Columbia University (MA, PhD)
- Known for: The person-centered approach (e.g., client-centered therapy, student-centered learning, Rogerian argument)
- Children: Natalie Rogers
- Awards: Award for Distinguished Scientific Contributions to Psychology (1956, APA); Award for Distinguished Contributions to Applied Psychology as a Professional Practice (1972, APA); 1964 Humanist of the Year (American Humanist Association)
- Scientific career
- Fields: Psychology
- Workplaces: Ohio State University; University of Chicago; University of Wisconsin–Madison; Western Behavioral Sciences Institute; Center for Studies of the Person
- Doctoral advisor: Goodwin Barbour Watson
- Other academic advisors: William Heard Kilpatrick
- Notable students: Eugene Gendlin

Carl Ransom Rogers (January 8, 1902 – February 4, 1987) was an American psychologist who was one of the founders of humanistic psychology and was known especially for his person-centered psychotherapy. Rogers is widely considered one of the founding fathers of psychotherapy research and was honored for his research with the Award for Distinguished Scientific Contributions by the American Psychological Association (APA) in 1956. He is also one of a number of psychologists to work on project MK-Ultra developing techniques for psychological torture.

The person-centered approach, Rogers's approach to understanding personality and human relationships, found wide application in various domains, such as psychotherapy and counseling (client-centered therapy), education (student-centered learning), organizations, and other group settings. For his professional work he received the Award for Distinguished Professional Contributions to Psychology from the APA in 1972. In a study by Steven J. Haggbloom and colleagues using six criteria such as citations and recognition, Rogers was found to be the sixth most eminent psychologist of the 20th century and second, among clinical psychologists, only to Sigmund Freud. Based on a 1982 survey of 422 respondents of U.S. and Canadian psychologists, he was considered the most influential psychotherapist in history (Freud ranked third).

== Biography ==
Rogers was born on January 8, 1902, in Oak Park, Illinois, a suburb of Chicago. His father, Walter A. Rogers, was a civil engineer and a Congregationalist by religious denomination. His mother, Julia M. Cushing, was a homemaker and devout Baptist. Carl was the fourth of their six children.

Rogers could read well before kindergarten. After being raised in a strict religious environment as an altar boy at the vicarage of Jimpley, he became isolated, independent, and disciplined, gaining knowledge and an appreciation for the scientific method in a practical world. At the University of Wisconsin–Madison, he joined the fraternity Alpha Kappa Lambda and initially planned to study agriculture before switching to history and finally settling on religion.

At age 20, following his 1922 trip to Beijing, China, for an international Christian conference, Rogers started to doubt his religious convictions. To help him clarify his career choice, he attended a seminar entitled "Why Am I Entering the Ministry?" after which he decided to change careers. In 1924, he graduated from the University of Wisconsin, married fellow Wisconsin student and Oak Park resident Helen Elliott, and enrolled at Union Theological Seminary in New York City. Sometime later, he reportedly became an atheist. Although referred to as an atheist early in his career, Rogers was eventually described as an agnostic. He reportedly spoke about spirituality quite often in his later years. Brian Thorne, who knew and collaborated with Rogers throughout the latter's final decade of life, writes: "In his later years his openness to experience compelled him to acknowledge the existence of a dimension to which he attached such adjectives as mystical, spiritual, and transcendental". Rogers concluded that there is a realm "beyond" scientific psychology—a realm he came to prize as "the indescribable, the spiritual."

After two years at Union, Rogers left to attend Teachers College, Columbia University, obtaining an M.A. in 1927 and a Ph.D. in 1931. While completing his doctoral work, he engaged in scientific studies of children. As an intern in 1927–1928 at the now-defunct Institute for Child Guidance in New York, Rogers studied with psychologist Alfred Adler. Later in life, Rogers recalled:

Accustomed as I was to the rather rigid Freudian approach of the Institute—seventy-five-page case histories, and exhaustive batteries of tests before even thinking of "treating" a child—I was shocked by Dr. Adler's very direct and deceptively simple manner of immediately relating to the child and the parent. It took me some time to realize how much I had learned from him.

In 1930, Rogers served as director of the Society for the Prevention of Cruelty to Children in Rochester, New York. From 1935 to 1940, he lectured at the University of Rochester and wrote The Clinical Treatment of the Problem Child (1939), based on his experience in working with troubled children. He was strongly influenced in constructing his client-centered approach by the post-Freudian psychotherapeutic practice of Otto Rank, especially as embodied in the work of Rank's disciple: noted clinician and social work educator Jessie Taft. In 1940, Rogers became professor of clinical psychology at Ohio State University, where he wrote his second book, Counseling and Psychotherapy (1942). In it, Rogers suggests that by establishing a relationship with an understanding, accepting therapist, a client can resolve difficulties and gain the insight necessary to restructure their life.

In 1945, Rogers was invited to set up a counseling center at the University of Chicago. While a professor of psychology at the University of Chicago (1945–1957), Rogers helped establish a counseling center connected with the university and conducted studies to determine his methods' effectiveness. His findings and theories appeared in Client-Centered Therapy (1951) and Psychotherapy and Personality Change (1954). One of his graduate students at the University of Chicago, Thomas Gordon, established the Parent Effectiveness Training movement. Another student, Eugene T. Gendlin, who was getting his Ph.D. in philosophy, developed the psychotherapeutic method of focusing, based on what he, along with other students of Rogers, discovered about what clients were doing when they had successful therapeutic outcomes.

In 1947, he was elected president of the American Psychological Association. In 1956, Rogers became the first president of the American Academy of Psychotherapists. He taught psychology at the University of Wisconsin, Madison (1957–1963). During this time, he wrote one of his best-known books, On Becoming a Person (1961). A student of his there, Marshall Rosenberg, went on to develop Nonviolent Communication. Rogers and Abraham Maslow pioneered a movement called humanistic psychology, which reached its peak in the 1960s. In 1961, he was elected a Fellow of the American Academy of Arts and Sciences. Rogers was also one of the people who questioned the rise of McCarthyism in the 1950s. In articles, he criticized society for its backward-looking affinities.

From the late 1950s into the '60s, Rogers served on the board of the Human Ecology Fund, a CIA-funded organization that provided grants to researchers looking into personality. In addition, he and other people in the field of personality and psychotherapy were given a lot of information about Khrushchev. "We were asked to figure out what we thought of him and what would be the best way of dealing with him. And that seemed to be an entirely principled and legitimate aspect. I don't think we contributed very much, but, anyway, we tried."

Rogers continued teaching at the University of Wisconsin until 1963 when he became a resident at the new Western Behavioral Sciences Institute (WBSI) in La Jolla, California. Rogers left the WBSI to help found the Center for Studies of the Person in 1968. His later books include Carl Rogers on Personal Power (1977) and Freedom to Learn for the '80s (1983). He remained a La Jolla resident for the rest of his life, doing therapy, giving speeches, and writing.

In his later years, Rogers focused on applying his theories to address political oppression and social conflict globally. He facilitated dialogue between Protestants and Catholics in Belfast, Blacks and Whites in South Africa, and people transitioning to democracy in Brazil. In the U.S., he worked with health consumers and providers. At 85, his final trip was to the Soviet Union, where he conducted workshops that promoted communication and creativity, impressed by the awareness of his work among Russians.

Between 1974 and 1984, Rogers, his daughter Natalie Rogers, and psychologists Maria Bowen, Maureen O'Hara, and John K. Wood convened a series of residential programs in the U.S., Europe, Brazil, and Japan: the Person-Centered Approach Workshops. The workshops focused on cross-cultural communications, personal growth, self-empowerment, and learning for social change.

In 1987, Rogers suffered a fall that resulted in a fractured pelvis; he had life alert and was able to contact paramedics. He had a successful operation, but his pancreas failed the next night, and he died a few days later after a heart attack.

== Theory ==
Rogers's theory of the self is considered humanistic, existential, and phenomenological. It is based directly on the "phenomenal field" personality theory of Combs and Snygg (1949). Rogers's elaboration of his theory is extensive. He wrote 16 books and many more journal articles about it. Prochaska and Norcross (2003) states Rogers "consistently stood for an empirical evaluation of psychotherapy. He and his followers have demonstrated a humanistic approach to conducting therapy and a scientific approach to evaluating therapy need not be incompatible."

=== Nineteen propositions ===
Rogers's theory (as of 1951) was based on 19 propositions:

1. All individuals (organisms) exist in a continually changing world of experience (phenomenal field) of which they are the center.
2. The organism reacts to the field as it is experienced and perceived. This perceptual field is "reality" for the individual.
3. The organism reacts as an organized whole to this phenomenal field.
4. A portion of the total perceptual field gradually becomes differentiated as the self.
5. As a result of interaction with the environment, and particularly as a result of evaluative interaction with others, the structure of the self is formed—an organized, fluid but consistent conceptual pattern of perceptions of characteristics and relationships of the "I" or the "me", together with values attached to these concepts.
6. The organism has one basic tendency and striving—to actualize, maintain and enhance the experiencing organism.
7. The best vantage point for understanding behavior is from the internal frame of reference of the individual.
8. Behavior is basically the goal-directed attempt of the organism to satisfy its needs as experienced, in the field as perceived.
9. Emotion accompanies, and in general facilitates, such goal directed behavior, the kind of emotion being related to the perceived significance of the behavior for the maintenance and enhancement of the organism.
10. The values attached to experiences, and the values that are a part of the self-structure, in some instances, are values experienced directly by the organism, and in some instances are values introjected or taken over from others, but perceived in distorted fashion, as if they had been experienced directly.
11. As experiences occur in the life of the individual, they are either (a) symbolized, perceived and organized into some relation to the self, (b) ignored because there is no perceived relationship to the self structure, or (c) denied symbolization or given distorted symbolization because the experience is inconsistent with the structure of the self.
12. Most of the ways of behaving that the organism adopts are those that are consistent with the concept of self.
13. In some instances, behavior may be brought about by organic experiences and needs that have not been symbolized. Such behavior may be inconsistent with the structure of the self, but in such instances the individual does not "own" the behavior.
14. Psychological adjustment exists when the concept of the self is such that all the sensory and visceral experiences of the organism are, or may be, assimilated on a symbolic level into a consistent relationship with the concept of self.
15. Psychological maladjustment exists when the organism denies awareness of significant sensory and visceral experiences, which consequently are not symbolized and organized into the gestalt of the self structure. When this situation exists, there is a basic or potential psychological tension.
16. Any experience that is inconsistent with the organization of the structure of the self may be perceived as a threat, and the more of these perceptions there are, the more rigidly the self structure is organized to maintain itself.
17. Under certain conditions, involving primarily complete absence of threat to the self structure, experiences inconsistent with it may be perceived and examined, and the structure of self revised to assimilate and include such experiences.
18. When the individual perceives and accepts into one consistent and integrated system all his sensory and visceral experiences, he is necessarily more understanding of others and more accepting of others as separate individuals.
19. As the individual perceives and accepts into his self structure more of his organic experiences, he finds that he is replacing his present value system—based extensively on introjections which have been distortedly symbolized—with a continuing organismic valuing process.

In relation to No. 17, Rogers is known for practicing "unconditional positive regard", which is defined as accepting a person "without negative judgment of .... [a person's] basic worth".

=== Development of the personality ===
With regard to development, Rogers described principles rather than stages. The main issue is the development of a self-concept and the progress from an undifferentiated self to being fully differentiated.

Self Concept ... the organized consistent conceptual gestalt composed of perceptions of the characteristics of 'I' or 'me' and the perceptions of the relationships of the 'I' or 'me' to others and to various aspects of life, together with the values attached to these perceptions. It is a gestalt which is available to awareness though not necessarily in awareness. It is a fluid and changing gestalt, a process, but at any given moment it is a specific entity. (Rogers, 1959)

In the development of the self-concept, he saw conditional and unconditional positive regard as key. Those raised in an environment of unconditional positive regard have the opportunity to fully actualize themselves. Those raised in an environment of conditional positive regard feel worthy only if they match conditions (what Rogers describes as conditions of worth) that others have laid down for them.

=== Fully functioning person ===
Optimal development, as referred to in proposition 14, results in a certain process rather than static state. Rogers calls this the good life, where the organism continually aims to fulfill its potential. He listed the characteristics of a fully functioning person (Rogers 1961):

1. A growing openness to experience: they move away from defensiveness and have no need for subception (a perceptual defense that involves unconsciously applying strategies to prevent a troubling stimulus from entering consciousness).
2. An increasingly existential lifestyle: living each moment fully, not distorting the moment to fit personality or self-concept but allowing personality and self-concept to emanate from the experience. This results in excitement, daring, adaptability, tolerance, spontaneity, and lack of rigidity, and suggests a foundation of trust. "To open one's spirit to what is going on now, and discover in that present process whatever structure it appears to have" (Rogers 1961).
3. Increasing organismic trust: they trust their own judgment and ability to choose behavior appropriate for each moment. They do not rely on existing codes and social norms but trust that as they are open to experiences they will be able to trust their own sense of right and wrong.
4. Freedom of choice: not being shackled by the restrictions that influence an incongruent individual, they are able to make a wider range of choices more fluently. They believe they play a role in determining their own behavior and so feel responsible for it.
5. Creativity: it follows that they will feel freer to be creative. They will also be more creative in the way they adapt to their circumstances without feeling a need to conform.
6. Reliability and constructiveness: they can be trusted to act constructively. An individual who is open to all their needs will be able to maintain a balance between them. Even aggressive needs will be matched and balanced by intrinsic goodness in congruent individuals.
7. A rich full life: Rogers describes the life of the fully functioning individual as rich, full and exciting, and suggests that they experience joy and pain, love and heartbreak, fear and courage more intensely. His description of the good life:
  This process of the good life is not, I am convinced, a life for the faint-hearted. It involves the stretching and growing of becoming more and more of one's potentialities. It involves the courage to be. It means launching oneself fully into the stream of life. (Rogers 1961)

=== Incongruity ===
Rogers identified the "real self" as the aspect of a person that is founded in the actualizing tendency, follows organismic values and needs, and receives positive regard from others and self. On the other hand, to the extent that society is out of sync with the actualizing tendency and people are forced to live with conditions of worth that are out of step with organismic valuing, receiving only conditional positive regard and self-regard, Rogers said that people develop instead an "ideal self". By ideal, he was suggesting something not real, something always out of reach, a standard people cannot meet. This gap between the real self and the ideal self, the "I am" and the "I should", Rogers called incongruity.

=== Psychopathology ===
Rogers described the concepts of congruence and incongruence as important in his theory. In proposition #6, he refers to the actualizing tendency. At the same time, he recognized the need for positive regard. In a fully congruent person, realizing their potential is not at the expense of experiencing positive regard. They are able to lead authentic and genuine lives. Incongruent individuals, in their pursuit of positive regard, lead lives that include falsity and do not realize their potential. Conditions put on them by those around them make it necessary for them to forgo their genuine, authentic lives to meet with others' approval. They live lives that are not true to themselves.

Rogers suggested that the incongruent individual, who is always on the defensive and cannot be open to all experiences, is not functioning ideally and may even be malfunctioning. They work hard at maintaining and protecting their self-concept. Because their lives are not authentic, this is difficult, and they are under constant threat. They deploy defense mechanisms to achieve this. He describes two mechanisms: distortion and denial. Distortion occurs when the individual perceives a threat to their self-concept. They distort the perception until it fits their self-concept. This defensive behavior reduces the consciousness of the threat but not the threat itself. And so, as the threats mount, the work of protecting the self-concept becomes more difficult and the individual becomes more defensive and rigid in their self-structure. If the incongruity is immoderate this process may lead the individual to a state that would typically be described as neurotic. Their functioning becomes precarious and psychologically vulnerable. If the situation worsens it is possible that the defenses cease to function altogether and the individual becomes aware of the incongruity of their situation. Their personality becomes disorganised and bizarre; irrational behavior, associated with earlier denied aspects of self, may erupt uncontrollably.

== Applications ==
=== Person-centered therapy ===
Rogers originally developed his theory as the foundation for a system of therapy. He initially called it "non-directive therapy" but later replaced the term "non-directive" with "client-centered", and still later "person-centered". Even before the publication of Client-Centered Therapy in 1951, Rogers believed the principles he was describing could be applied in a variety of contexts, not just in therapy. As a result, he started to use the term person-centered approach to describe his overall theory. Person-centered therapy is the application of the person-centered approach to therapy. Other applications include a theory of personality, interpersonal relations, education, nursing, cross-cultural relations and other "helping" professions and situations. In 1946 Rogers co-authored "Counseling with Returned Servicemen" with John L. Wallen (the creator of the behavioral model known as The Interpersonal Gap), documenting the application of a person-centered approach to counseling military personnel returning from World War II.

The first empirical evidence of the client-centered approach's effectiveness was published in 1941 at the Ohio State University by Elias Porter, using the recordings of therapeutic sessions between Rogers and his clients. Porter used Rogers's transcripts to devise a system to measure the degree of directiveness or non-directiveness a counselor employed. The counselor's attitude and orientation were shown to be instrumental in the decisions the client made.

=== Learner-centered teaching ===
The application to education has a large robust research tradition similar to that of therapy, with studies having begun in the late 1930s and continuing today (Cornelius-White, 2007). Rogers described the approach to education in Client-Centered Therapy and wrote Freedom to Learn devoted exclusively to the subject in 1969. Freedom to Learn was revised twice. The new Learner-Centered Model is similar in many regards to this classical person-centered approach to education.

Before Rogers's death, he and Harold Lyon began a book, On Becoming an Effective Teacher—Person-centered Teaching, Psychology, Philosophy, and Dialogues with Carl R. Rogers and Harold Lyon, that Lyon and Reinhard Tausch completed and published in 2013. It contains Rogers's last unpublished writings on person-centered teaching. Rogers had the following five hypotheses regarding learner-centered education:

1. "A person cannot teach another person directly; a person can only facilitate another's learning" (Rogers, 1951). This is a result of his personality theory, which states that everyone exists in a constantly changing world of experience in which they are the center. Each person reacts and responds based on perception and experience. The belief is that what the student does is more important than what the teacher does. The focus is on the student (Rogers, 1951). Therefore, the background and experiences of the learner are essential to how and what is learned. Each student will process what they learn differently depending on what they bring to the classroom.
2. "A person learns significantly only those things that are perceived as being involved in the maintenance of or enhancement of the structure of self" (Rogers, 1951). Therefore, relevancy to the student is essential for learning. The students' experiences become the core of the course.
3. "Experience which, if assimilated, would involve a change in the organization of self, tends to be resisted through denial or distortion of symbolism" (Rogers, 1951). If the content or presentation of a course is inconsistent with preconceived information, the student will learn if they are open to varying concepts. Being open to concepts that vary from one's own is vital to learning. Therefore, gently encouraging open-mindedness is helpful in engaging the student in learning. Also, it is important, for this reason, that new information be relevant and related to existing experience.
4. "The structure and organization of self appears to become more rigid under threats and to relax its boundaries when completely free from threat" (Rogers, 1951). If students believe that concepts are being forced upon them, they might become uncomfortable and fearful. A barrier is created by a tone of threat in the classroom. Therefore, an open, friendly environment in which trust is developed is essential in the classroom. Fear of retribution for not agreeing with a concept should be eliminated. A supportive classroom tone helps to alleviate fears and encourages students to have the courage to explore concepts and beliefs that vary from those they bring to the classroom. Also, new information might threaten the student's concept of themself; therefore, the less vulnerable the student feels, the more likely they will be able to open up to the learning process.
5. "The educational situation which most effectively promotes significant learning is one in which (a) threat to the self of the learner is reduced to a minimum and (b) differentiated perception of the field is facilitated" (Rogers, 1951). The instructor should be open to learning from the students and working to connect the students to the subject matter. Frequent interaction with the students will help achieve this goal. The instructor's acceptance of being a mentor who guides rather than the expert who tells is instrumental to student-centered, nonthreatening, and unforced learning.

=== Rogerian rhetorical approach ===
In 1970, Richard Young, Alton L. Becker, and Kenneth Pike published Rhetoric: Discovery and Change, a widely influential college writing textbook that used a Rogerian approach to communication to revise the traditional Aristotelian framework for rhetoric. The Rogerian method of argument involves each side restating the other's position to the satisfaction of the other, among other principles. In a paper, it can be expressed by carefully acknowledging and understanding the opposition, rather than dismissing them.

=== Cross-cultural relations ===
The application to cross-cultural relations has involved workshops in highly stressful situations and global locations, including conflicts and challenges in South Africa, Central America, and Ireland. Rogers, Alberto Zucconi, and Charles Devonshire co-founded the Istituto dell'Approccio Centrato sulla Persona (Person-Centered Approach Institute) in Rome, Italy.

Rogers's international work for peace culminated in the Rust Peace Workshop, which took place in November 1985 in Rust, Austria. Leaders from 17 nations convened to discuss the topic "The Central America Challenge". The meeting was notable for several reasons: it brought national figures together as people (not as their positions), it was a private event, and was an overwhelming positive experience where members heard one another and established real personal ties, as opposed to stiffly formal and regulated diplomatic meetings.

=== Person-centered, dialogic politics ===
Some scholars believe there is a politics implicit in Rogers's approach to psychotherapy. Toward the end of his life, Rogers came to that view himself. The central tenet of Rogerian, person-centered politics is that public life need not consist of an endless series of winner-take-all battles among sworn opponents; rather, it can and should consist of an ongoing dialogue among all parties. Such dialogue is characterized by respect among the parties, authentic speaking by each, and—ultimately—empathic understanding among all parties. Out of such understanding, mutually acceptable solutions will (or at least can) flow.

During his last decade, Rogers facilitated or participated in a wide variety of dialogic activities among politicians, activists, and other social leaders, often outside the U.S. He also lent his support to several non-traditional U.S. political initiatives, including the "12-Hour Political Party" of the Association for Humanistic Psychology and the founding of a "transformational" political organization, the New World Alliance. By the 21st century, interest in dialogic approaches to political engagement and change had become widespread, especially among academics and activists. Theorists of a specifically Rogerian, person-centered approach to politics as dialogue have made substantial contributions to that project.

== Research on his work ==
Howard Kirschenbaum has conducted extensive research on the work of Carl Rogers and the person-centered/client centered approach. Kirschenbaum published the first thorough book in English on Rogers's life and work, titled On Becoming Carl Rogers, in 1979, followed by the biography The Life and Work of Carl Rogers in 2007.

== Selected works ==
- Rogers, Carl, and Carmichael, Leonard (1939). The Clinical Treatment of the Problem Child. Boston; New York: Houghton Mifflin Company.
- Rogers, Carl. (1942). Counseling and Psychotherapy: Newer Concepts in Practice. Boston; New York: Houghton Mifflin Company.
- Rogers, Carl. (1951). Client-Centered Therapy: Its Current Practice, Implications and Theory. London: Constable. ISBN 1-84119-840-4.
- Rogers, C.R. (1957). The necessary and sufficient conditions of therapeutic personality change. Journal of Consulting and Clinical Psychology, 21: 95–103.
- Rogers, Carl. (1959). A Theory of Therapy, Personality and Interpersonal Relationships as Developed in the Client-centered Framework. In (ed.) S. Koch, Psychology: A Study of a Science. Vol. 3: Formulations of the Person and the Social Context. New York: McGraw Hill.
- Rogers, Carl. (1961). On Becoming a Person: A Therapist's View of Psychotherapy. London: Constable. ISBN 1-84529-057-7.Excerpts
- Rogers, Carl. (1969). Freedom to Learn: A View of What Education Might Become. (1st ed.) Columbus, Ohio: Charles Merill. Excerpts
- Rogers, Carl. (1970). On Encounter Groups. New York: Harrow Books, Harper and Row, ISBN 0-06-087045-1
- Rogers, Carl. (1977). On Personal Power: Inner Strength and Its Revolutionary Impact.
- Rogers, Carl. (nd, @1978). A personal message from Carl Rogers. In: N. J. Raskin. (2004). Contributions to Client-Centered Therapy and the Person-Centered Approach. (pp. v-vi). Herefordshire, United Kingdom: PCCS Books, Ross-on-the-Wye. ISBN 1-898059-57-8
- Rogers, Carl. (1980). A Way of Being. Boston: Houghton Mifflin.
- Rogers, Carl. and Stevens, B. (1967). Person to Person: The Problem of Being Human. Lafayette, CA: Real People Press.
- Rogers, Carl, Lyon, Harold C., & Tausch, Reinhard (2013) On Becoming an Effective Teacher—Person-centered Teaching, Psychology, Philosophy, and Dialogues with Carl R. Rogers and Harold Lyon. London: Routledge, ISBN 978-0-415-81698-4
- Rogers, C.R., Raskin, N.J., et al. (1949). A coordinated research in psychotherapy. Journal of Consulting Psychology, 13, 149–200. Cited in: N.J. Raskin, The first 50 years and the next 10. Person-Centered Review, 5(4), November 1990, 364–372.

== See also ==
- Hidden personality

== Sources ==
- Cornelius-White, Jeffrey (March 2007). "Learner-Centered Teacher-Student Relationships Are Effective: A Meta-Analysis". Review of Educational Research. 77 (1): 113–143. doi:10.3102/003465430298563.
- Raskin, N. (2004). Contributions to Client-Centered Therapy and the Person-Centered Approach. Herefordshire, Ross-on-the-Rye, UK: PCCS Books.
