= Eugene Gendlin =

American philosopher (1926 – 2017)

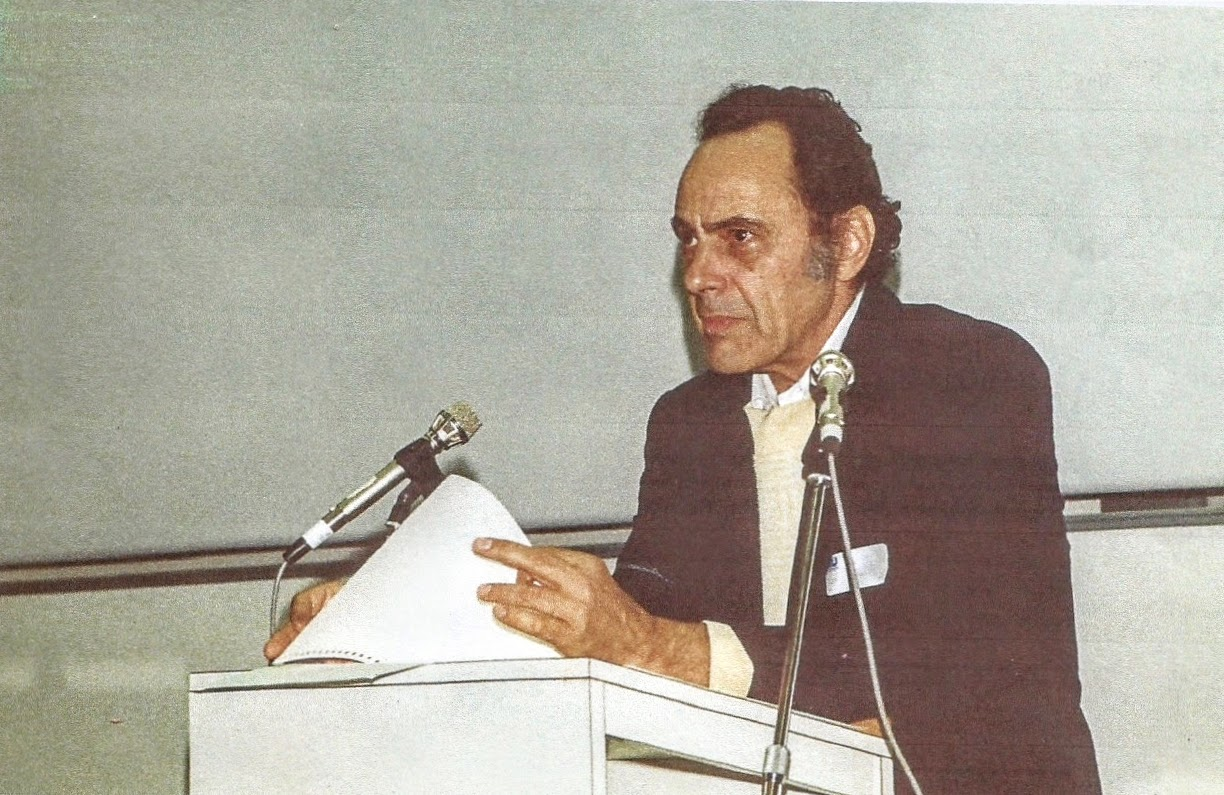
- Born: Eugen Gendelin; December 25, 1926; Vienna, Austria
- Died: May 1, 2017 (aged 90); Spring Valley, New York, U.S.
- Other name: Eugene Tovio Gendlin
- Education: Catholic University of America; University of Chicago (PhD, 1958)
- Known for: Philosophy of the implicit, focusing, Thinking at the Edge, process model
- Scientific career
- Fields: Psychology, philosophy
- Workplaces: University of Chicago
- Academic advisors: Richard McKeon, Carl Rogers

Eugene Tovio Gendlin (/ˈdʒɛndlɪn/; born Eugen Gendelin, German: [ˈɡɛndəlɪn]; 25 December 1926 – 1 May 2017) was an American philosopher who developed ways of thinking about and working with living process, the bodily felt sense and the "philosophy of the implicit".

Though he had no degree in the field of psychology, his advanced study with Carl Rogers, his longtime practice of psychotherapy and his extensive writings in the field of psychology have made him perhaps better known in that field than in philosophy. He studied under Carl Rogers, the founder of client-centered therapy, at the University of Chicago and received his PhD in philosophy in 1958. Gendlin's theories impacted Rogers' own beliefs and played a role in Rogers' view of psychotherapy. From 1958 to 1963, Gendlin was Research Director at the Wisconsin Psychiatric Institute of the University of Wisconsin. He served as an associate professor in the departments of Philosophy and Comparative Human Development at the University of Chicago from 1964 until 1995.

Gendlin is best known for focusing, a psychotherapy technique, and for "Thinking at the Edge", a general procedure for "thinking with more than patterns". In the 1950s and 60s, under the guidance of Rogers, Gendlin did research demonstrating that a client's ability to realize lasting positive change in psychotherapy depended on their ability to access a nonverbal, bodily feel of the issues that brought them into therapy. Gendlin gave the name "felt sense" to this intuitive body-feel for unresolved issues. Realizing that people could be taught this skill, in 1978 Gendlin published his best-selling book Focusing, which presented a six-step method for discovering one's felt sense and drawing on it for personal development. Gendlin founded The Focusing Institute in 1985 (now the International Focusing Institute) to facilitate training and education in Focusing for academic and professional communities and to share the practice with the public.

In the mid-1980s, Gendlin served on the original editorial board for the journal The Humanistic Psychologist, published by Division 32 of the American Psychological Association (APA). He has been honored by the APA four times, and was the first recipient of their Distinguished Professional Award in Psychology and Psychotherapy (given by Division 29, this award is now called the Distinguished Psychologist Award for Contributions to Psychology and Psychotherapy). He was awarded the Viktor Frankl prize by the Viktor Frankl Family Foundation in 2008. In 2016, he was honored with a lifetime achievement award from the World Association for Person Centered and Experiential Psychotherapy and Counseling and another lifetime achievement award was given to him that same year by the United States Association for Body Psychotherapy. Gendlin was a founder and longtime editor of the journal Psychotherapy: Theory, Research and Practice as well as the in-house journal of the Focusing Institute called the Folio, and is the author of a number of books, including Focusing-Oriented Psychotherapy: A Manual of the Experiential Method. The mass-market edition of his popular classic Focusing has been translated into 20 languages and sold more than a half million copies.

== Life ==
Gendlin was born in Vienna, Austria, on December 25, 1926. He lived with his parents in the 9th district of Vienna, a very Jewish district at that time. His mother was Sylvia Gendelin-Tobell. His father, Leonid Gendelin, had earned a doctoral degree in chemistry from the University of Graz. Gendelin had a dry cleaning business in Vienna. The family left Austria due to the rise of the Nazi Party and the danger to Jewish families such as his. They first fled to the Netherlands and later emigrated to the United States on the SS Paris (1916) on its last voyage to New York, arriving January 11, 1939. The family changed their name to Gendlin upon their arrival in the United States, and in English it is pronounced JEHND-lin (not with the hard "g" as in German pronunciation). Gendlin went on to serve in the United States Navy and to become a U.S. citizen.

Gendlin lived in New York State until his death. He had three children: Gerry and Judith from his first marriage with wife Fran; and a daughter, Elissa, with his second wife, Mary Hendricks-Gendlin. Gerry Gendlin is an expert on Russia and served as an associate professor in the department of History, Politics, Languages and Cultures at Edinboro University in Edinboro, Pennsylvania. Mary worked closely with Gendlin and served for many years as the director of The Focusing Institute. Mary Hendricks-Gendlin died in 2015.

== Philosophy ==
Gendlin regarded himself first and foremost as a philosopher and he brought a rigorous philosophical perspective to psychology, presented in his early book Experiencing and the Creation of Meaning and later developed into a comprehensive theory of the deep nature of life processes, articulated in his masterwork A Process Model. From 1968 to 1995, he taught at the University of Chicago, where he taught a course on theory-building that later gave rise to a new practice called "Thinking at the Edge", a fourteen-step method for drawing on one's non-conceptual, experiential knowing about any topic to create novel theory and concepts. Gendlin asserts that an organism's living interaction with its environment is prior (temporally and philosophically) to abstract knowledge about its environment. Living is an intricate, ordered interaction with the environment, and as such, is a kind of knowing. Abstract knowledge is a development of this more basic knowing.

The fact that concepts change does not mean that they are arbitrary; concepts can be formulated in many diverse and incompatible ways, but to the extent that they are rooted in experience, each formulation has its own precise relationship to experience. Thus Gendlin's philosophy goes beyond relativism and postmodernism. He agrees with postmodernists that culture and language are always already implicit in experiencing and in concepts. Empirical testing is crucial, but it does not keep science from changing every few years. No assertions are simply "objective".

Gendlin points out that the universe (and everything in it) is implicitly more intricate than concepts, because a) it includes them, and b) all concepts and logical units are generated in a wider, more than conceptual process (which Gendlin calls implicit intricacy). This wider process is more than logical, in a way that has a number of characteristic regularities. Gendlin has shown that it is possible to refer directly to this process in the context of a given problem or situation and systematically generate new concepts and more precise logical units.

Because human beings are in an ongoing interaction with the world (they breathe, eat, and interact with others in every context and in any field in which they work), their bodies are a "knowing" which is more than conceptual and which implies further steps. Thus, it is possible for one to drive a car while carrying on an animated conversation; and it is possible for Einstein to say that he had a "feel" for his theory years before he could formulate it.

Human beings' ongoing interaction with the world provides ongoing validity. Each move, from pumping blood to discussing philosophy, implies a next step, an organic carrying forward. Humans feel this carrying forward both in the move itself and in the feedback it generates: at each moment, it is possible to feel how things are moving and what is implied next. With specific training, one can learn to attend to this feeling more deeply, so that a holistic felt sense of the whole situation can form.

A felt sense is quite different from "feeling" in the sense of emotions; it is one's bodily awareness of the ongoing life process. Because a felt sense is a living interaction in the world, it is not relative in the way that concepts are. A felt sense is more ordered than concepts and has its own properties, different from those of logic; for example, it is very precise, more intricate, and can be conceptualized in a variety of non-arbitrary ways. Much of Gendlin's philosophy is concerned with showing how this implicit bodily knowing functions in relation to logic. For example, Gendlin has found that when the felt sense is allowed to function in relation to concepts, each carries the other forward, through steps of deeper feel and new formulation.

Gendlin underlines that one can (and often does) "progress" in one's understanding, and that this involves transitions in which existing conceptual models are disrupted, but that one can "feel" when a carrying forward in insight is (or is not) occurring. One can "feel" this because human logical conceptions are dependent on a more intricate order, which is living-in-the-world. Useful concepts derive from and are relative to this sense more than logical, intricate order, not the other way round.

== Focusing ==
Focusing emerged from Gendlin's collaboration with psychologist Carl Rogers. Gendlin developed a way of measuring the extent to which an individual refers to a felt sense; and he found in a series of studies that therapy clients who have positive outcomes do much more of this. He then developed a way to teach people to refer to their felt sense, so clients could do better in therapy. This training is called 'Focusing'. Further research showed that Focusing can be used outside therapy to address a variety of issues. It is described in Gendlin's book, Focusing, which has sold over 500,000 copies and is printed in twelve languages. In Focusing he wrote:

When I use the word "body," I mean more than the physical machine. Not only do you physically live the circumstances around you but also those you only think of in your mind. Your physically felt body is in fact part of a gigantic system of here and other places, now and other times, you and other people–in fact, the whole universe. This sense of being bodily alive in a vast system is the body as it is felt from inside.

In 1970, Gendlin was the first person to receive the "Distinguished Professional Award in Psychology and Psychotherapy" from the Psychotherapy Division (Division 29) of the American Psychological Association. In 2000, Gendlin also received, along with The Focusing Institute, the Charlotte and Karl Bühler Award from the Society of Humanistic Psychology (Division 32 of the American Psychological Association). In 2007, he was a recipient of the Viktor Frankl Award of the City of Vienna for outstanding achievements in the field of meaning-oriented humanistic psychotherapy.

The worldwide dissemination of Focusing has been facilitated by The International Focusing Institute. This nonprofit organization defines itself as "an international, cross-cultural organization dedicated to supporting individuals and groups world-wide who are practicing, teaching and developing Focusing and its underlying philosophy". Their 2010 Membership Directory listed about 2,000 members in over 40 countries. Its website houses the Gendlin Online Library.

== Thinking at the Edge ==
Thinking at the Edge (TAE), a practice initially developed by Mary N. Hendricks on the basis of Eugene Gendlin's philosophy of the implicit, is a way of developing one's implicit knowing into an articulated theory. For example, a professional might have had an inchoate felt sense for a problem for many years. Using TAE, it is possible to develop concepts that explicate the felt sense very precisely so that what was implicit knowledge can generate an explicit theory that can contribute to the field.

== Awards ==
- 1970: "Distinguished Professional Award in Psychology and Psychotherapy", from Division 29 of the American Psychological Association (Division of Psychotherapy)
- 2000: "Charlotte and Karl Bühler Award" (given jointly to Gendlin and The Focusing Institute), from Division 32 of the American Psychological Association (the Society for Humanistic Psychology)
- 2007: "Viktor Frankl Award of the City of Vienna for outstanding achievements in the field of meaning-oriented humanistic psychotherapy", from the Viktor Frankl Foundation
- 2011: "Distinguished Theoretical and Philosophical Contributions to Psychology", from Division 24 of the American Psychological Association (The Society for Theoretical and Philosophical Psychology)
- 2016: "Lifetime Achievement", from the World Association for Person Centered and Experiential Psychotherapy and Counseling
- 2016: "Lifetime Achievement", from the US Association for Body Psychotherapy
- 2021: "Memorial Award for Lifetime Achievement", from Division 24 of the American Psychological Association (The Society for Theoretical and Philosophical Psychology)

== Bibliography ==
Gendlin's philosophical works include:

- Experiencing and the Creation of Meaning: a Philosophical and Psychological Approach to the Subjective (1962)
- Thinking Beyond Patterns: Body, Language, and Situations (1991)
- The Primacy of the body, not the primacy of perception: How the body knows the situation and philosophy (1992)
- Crossing and Dipping: Some Terms for Approaching the Interface between Natural Understanding and Logical Formulation (1995)
- A Process Model (1997)
- The Responsive Order: A New Empiricism (1997)
- How philosophy cannot appeal to experience, and how it can (1997) (in D.M. Levin [Ed.], Language beyond postmodernism: saying and thinking in Gendlin's philosophy, pp. 3–41 & 343).
- "Introduction to Thinking At The Edge" (2004) (in The Folio, Vol 19 No 1, 2004).
- Line by Line Commentary on Aristotle's De Anima, Volume 1: Books I & II; Volume 2: Book III. Spring Valley, New York: The Focusing Institute (2012).

His writings on focusing and psychotherapy include:

- Focusing (1978)
- Let Your Body Interpret Your Dreams (1986)
- Focusing-Oriented Psychotherapy (1996)

Many of Gendlin's writings are available online at the Focusing Institute and the Gendlin Online Library.

== See also ==
- American philosophy
