= Unemployment in Scotland =

Measures of Scottish unemployment

Unemployment in Scotland measured by the Office for National Statistics show unemployment in Scotland at 155,000 (5.6%) as of August 2015.

== Statistics ==
Resident population in Scotland (2020)
Category	Population	%
Total population	5,466,000	-
Population aged 16–64	3,493,100	63.9
Job density	2,866,000	82

Labour supply in Scotland (Jun 2021-Aug 2021)
Category	Population	%
Economically active	2,763,000	78.6%
Employed	2,641,000	74.3%
Unemployed	121,000	4.4%
Jobseeker's Allowance (JSA) (claimant count)	161,671	5.1%
Economically inactive	760,000	22.2%

Economically inactive in Scotland (Jul 2020-Jun 2021)
Category	Scotland	Scotland (%)	United Kingdom	United Kingdom (%)
Total	826,700	24.1	8,991,700	21.8
Student	214,200	25.9	2,561,600	28.5
Looking After Family/Home	140,200	17.0	1,731,600	19.3
Temporary Sick	16,900	2.0	178,900	2.0
Long-Term Sick	245,200	29.7	2,170,200	24.1
Discouraged	9,300	1.1	70,200	0.8
Retired	121,000	14.6	1,210,500	13.5
Other	80,000	9.7	1,068,800	11.9
Wants A Job	156,600	18.9	1,857,500	20.7
Does Not Want A Job	670,100	81.1	7,134,200	79.3

Qualifications levels in Scotland (Jan 2020-Dec 2020)
Category	Scotland	Scotland (%)	United Kingdom	United Kingdom (%)
NVQ4 And Above	1,678,400	49.0	17,732,200	43.0
NVQ3	443,500	12.9	6,927,400	16.8
Trade Apprenticeships	122,300	3.6	1,157,900	2.8
NVQ2	470,900	13.7	6,373,000	15.4
NVQ1	238,900	7.0	3,968,300	9.6
Other Qualifications	196,500	5.7	2,389,700	5.8
No Qualifications	276,500	8.1	2,721,300	6.6
NVQ4 And Above	1,678,400	49.0	17,732,200	43.0
NVQ3 And Above	2,183,000	63.7	25,238,500	61.2
NVQ2 And Above	2,715,100	79.2	32,190,500	78.0
NVQ1 And Above	2,954,000	86.2	36,158,800	87.6

== See also ==
- Scottish Unemployed Workers Network
- Unemployment in the United Kingdom
- Unemployment in Spain
- Unemployment in Poland
