= Unemployment =

People without work and actively seeking work

Unemployment rate

Female unemployment rate

Unemployment is the state of not being in paid employment or self-employment but currently available for work. Unemployment is measured by the unemployment rate, which is the number of people who are unemployed as a percentage of the labour force (the total number of people employed above a specified age added to those unemployed) during the reference period.

== Causes ==
Unemployment can have many sources, such as the following below:

- the status of the economy, which can be influenced by a recession
- competition caused by globalization and international trade
- new technologies and inventions
- policies of the government
- regulation and market
- war, civil disorder, and natural disasters
- poor work–life balance (requiring too much time off)

Unemployment and the status of the economy can be influenced by a country through, for example, fiscal policy. Furthermore, the monetary authority of a country, such as the central bank, can influence the availability and cost for money through its monetary policy.

In addition to theories of unemployment, a few categorisations of unemployment are used for more precisely modelling the effects of unemployment within the economic system. Some of the main types of unemployment include structural unemployment, frictional unemployment, cyclical unemployment, involuntary unemployment and classical unemployment. Structural unemployment focuses on foundational problems in the economy and inefficiencies inherent in labor markets, including a mismatch between the supply and demand of laborers with necessary skill sets. Structural arguments emphasize causes and solutions related to disruptive technologies and globalization. Discussions of frictional unemployment focus on voluntary decisions to work based on individuals' valuation of their own work and how that compares to current wage rates added to the time and effort required to find a job. Causes and solutions for frictional unemployment often address job entry threshold and wage rates.

According to the UN's International Labour Organization (ILO), there were 172 million people worldwide (or 5% of the reported global workforce) without work in 2018.

Because of the difficulty in measuring the unemployment rate by, for example, using surveys (as in the United States) or through registered unemployed citizens (as in some European countries), statistical figures such as the employment-to-population ratio might be more suitable for evaluating the status of the workforce and the economy if they were based on people who are registered, for example, as taxpayers.

Work permits for foreign workers can in some cases crowd out citizens out of employment.

== Definitions, types, and theories ==
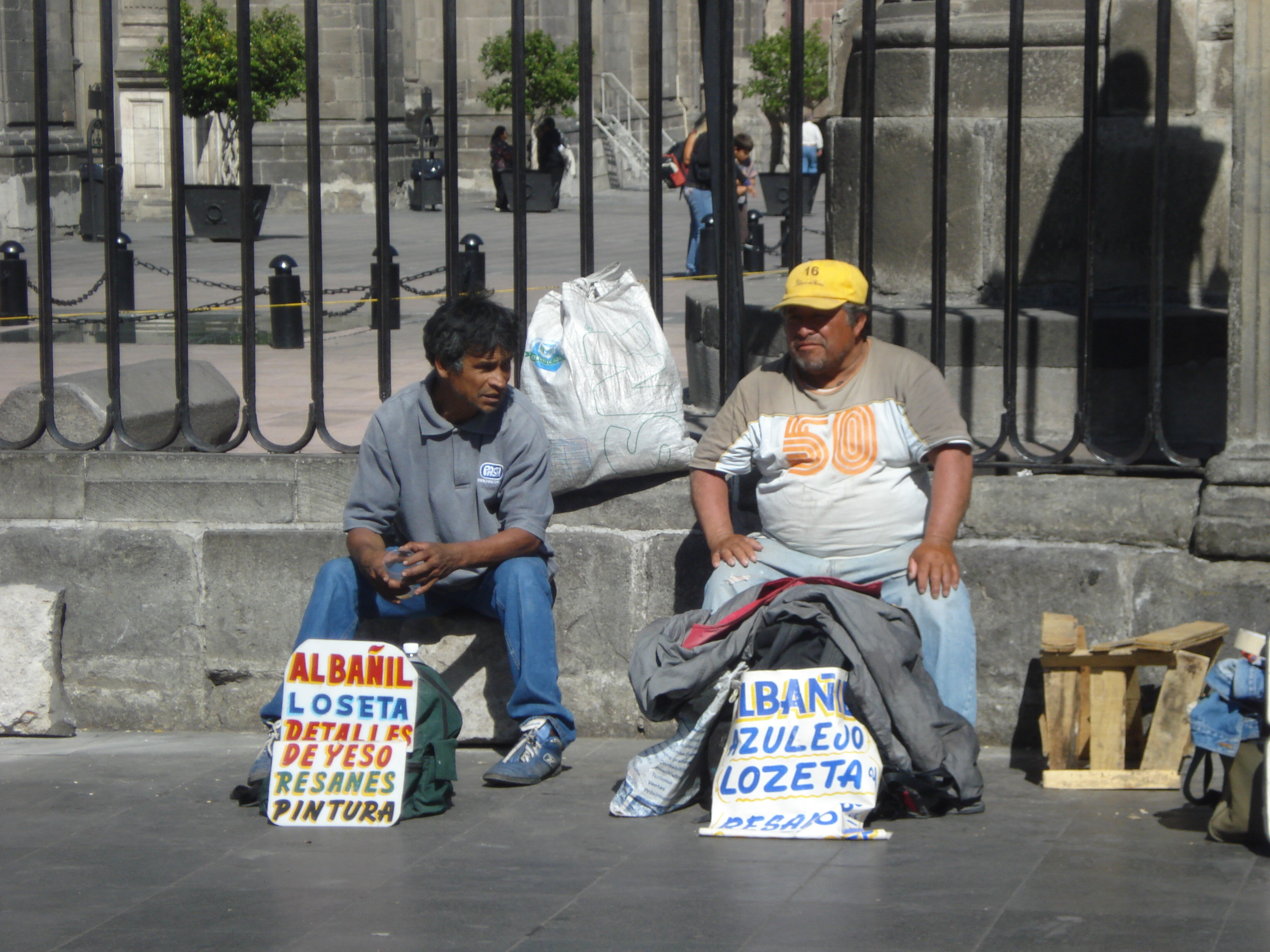
Unemployment in Mexico 2009

The state of being without any work yet looking for work is called unemployment. Economists distinguish between various overlapping types of and theories of unemployment, including cyclical or Keynesian unemployment, frictional unemployment, structural unemployment and classical unemployment definition. Some additional types of unemployment that are occasionally mentioned are seasonal unemployment, hardcore unemployment, and hidden unemployment.

Though there have been several definitions of "voluntary" and "involuntary unemployment" in the economics literature, a simple distinction is often applied. Voluntary unemployment is attributed to the individual's decisions, but involuntary unemployment exists because of the socio-economic environment (including the market structure, government intervention, and the level of aggregate demand) in which individuals operate. In these terms, much or most of frictional unemployment is voluntary since it reflects individual search behavior. Voluntary unemployment includes workers who reject low-wage jobs, but involuntary unemployment includes workers fired because of an economic crisis, industrial decline, company bankruptcy, or organizational restructuring.

On the other hand, cyclical unemployment, structural unemployment, and classical unemployment are largely involuntary in nature. However, the existence of structural unemployment may reflect choices made by the unemployed in the past, and classical (natural) unemployment may result from the legislative and economic choices made by labour unions or political parties.

The clearest cases of involuntary unemployment are those with fewer job vacancies than unemployed workers even when wages are allowed to adjust and so even if all vacancies were to be filled, some unemployed workers would still remain. That happens with cyclical unemployment, as macroeconomic forces cause microeconomic unemployment, which can boomerang back and exacerbate those macroeconomic forces.

=== Real wage unemployment ===
Classical, natural, or real-wage unemployment, occurs when real wages for a job are set above the market-clearing level, causing the number of job-seekers to exceed the number of vacancies. On the other hand, most economists argue that as wages fall below a livable wage, many choose to drop out of the labour market and no longer seek employment. That is especially true in countries in which low-income families are supported through public welfare systems. In such cases, wages would have to be high enough to motivate people to choose employment over what they receive through public welfare. Wages below a livable wage are likely to result in lower labor market participation in the above-stated scenario. In addition, consumption of goods and services is the primary driver of increased demand for labor. Higher wages lead to workers having more income available to consume goods and services. Therefore, higher wages increase general consumption and as a result demand for labor increases and unemployment decreases.

Many economists have argued that unemployment increases with increased governmental regulation. For example, minimum wage laws raise the cost of some low-skill laborers above market equilibrium, resulting in increased unemployment as people who wish to work at the going rate cannot (as the new and higher enforced wage is now greater than the value of their labour). Laws restricting layoffs may make businesses less likely to hire in the first place, as hiring becomes more risky.

However, that argument overly simplifies the relationship between wage rates and unemployment by ignoring numerous factors that contribute to unemployment. Some, such as Murray Rothbard, suggest that even social taboos can prevent wages from falling to the market-clearing level.

In Out of Work: Unemployment and Government in the Twentieth-Century America, economists Richard Vedder and Lowell Gallaway argue that the empirical record of wages rates, productivity, and unemployment in America validates classical unemployment theory. Their data shows a strong correlation between adjusted real wage and unemployment in the United States from 1900 to 1990. However, they maintain that their data does not take into account exogenous events.

=== Cyclical unemployment ===
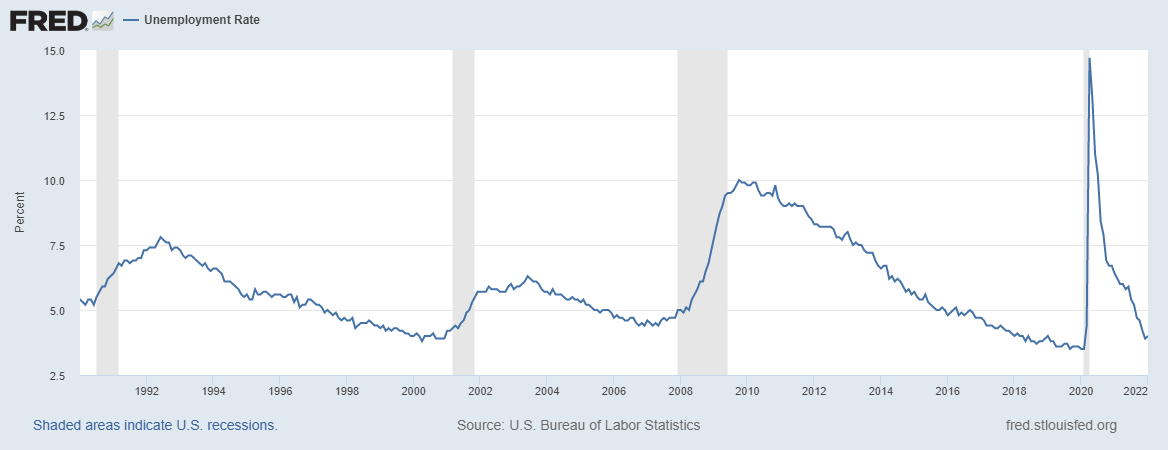
US unemployment rate, 1990—2022. The increase in unemployment during recessions (shaded) is called cyclical unemployment.

Cyclical, deficient-demand, or Keynesian unemployment occurs when there is not enough aggregate demand in the economy to provide jobs for everyone who wants to work. Demand for most goods and services falls, less production is needed and consequently, fewer workers are needed, wages are sticky and do not fall to meet the equilibrium level, and unemployment results. Its name is derived from the frequent ups and downs in the business cycle, but unemployment can also be persistent, such as during the Great Depression.

With cyclical unemployment, the number of unemployed workers exceeds the number of job vacancies and so even if all open jobs were filled, some workers would still remain unemployed. Some associate cyclical unemployment with frictional unemployment because the factors that cause the friction are partially caused by cyclical variables. For example, a surprise decrease in the money supply may suddenly inhibit aggregate demand and thus inhibit labor demand.

Keynesian economists, on the other hand, see the lack of supply of jobs as potentially resolvable by government intervention. One suggested intervention involves deficit spending to boost employment and goods demand. Another intervention involves an expansionary monetary policy to increase the supply of money, which should reduce interest rates, which, in turn, should lead to an increase in non-governmental spending.

=== Full employment ===
Short-run Phillips curve before and after Expansionary Policy, with Long-Run Phillips Curve (NAIRU). Note, however, that the unemployment rate is an inaccurate predictor of inflation in the long term.

In demands based theory, it is possible to abolish cyclical unemployment by increasing the aggregate demand for products and workers. However, the economy eventually hits an "inflation barrier" that is imposed by the four other kinds of unemployment to the extent that they exist. Historical experience suggests that low unemployment affects inflation in the short term but not the long term. In the long term, the velocity of money supply measures such as the MZM ("money zero maturity", representing cash and equivalent demand deposits) velocity is far more predictive of inflation than low unemployment.

Some demand theory economists see the inflation barrier as corresponding to the natural rate of unemployment. The "natural" rate of unemployment is defined as the rate of unemployment that exists when the labour market is in equilibrium, and there is pressure for neither rising inflation rates nor falling inflation rates. An alternative technical term for that rate is the NAIRU, the Non-Accelerating Inflation Rate of Unemployment. Whatever its name, demand theory holds that if the unemployment rate gets "too low", inflation will accelerate in the absence of wage and price controls (incomes policies).

One of the major problems with the NAIRU theory is that no one knows exactly what the NAIRU is, and it clearly changes over time. The margin of error can be quite high relative to the actual unemployment rate, making it hard to use the NAIRU in policy-making.

Another, normative, definition of full employment might be called the ideal unemployment rate. It would exclude all types of unemployment that represent forms of inefficiency. This type of "full employment" unemployment would correspond to only frictional unemployment (excluding that part encouraging the McJobs management strategy) and so would be very low. However, it would be impossible to attain this full-employment target using only demand-side Keynesian stimulus without getting below the NAIRU and causing accelerating inflation (absent incomes policies). Training programs aimed at fighting structural unemployment would help here.

To the extent that hidden unemployment exists, it implies that official unemployment statistics provide a poor guide to what unemployment rate coincides with "full employment".

=== Structural unemployment ===
Okun's Law interprets unemployment as a function of the rate of growth in GDP.

Structural unemployment occurs when a labour market is unable to provide jobs for everyone who wants one because there is a mismatch between the skills of the unemployed workers and the skills needed for the available jobs. Structural unemployment is hard to separate empirically from frictional unemployment except that it lasts longer. As with frictional unemployment, simple demand-side stimulus will not work to abolish this type of unemployment easily.

Structural unemployment may also be encouraged to rise by persistent cyclical unemployment: if an economy suffers from longlasting low aggregate demand, it means that many of the unemployed become disheartened, and their skills (including job-searching skills) become "rusty" and obsolete. Problems with debt may lead to homelessness and a fall into the vicious cycle of poverty, which means that people affected in this way may not fit the job vacancies that are created when the economy recovers. The implication is that sustained high demand may lower structural unemployment. This theory of persistence in structural unemployment has been referred to as an example of path dependence or "hysteresis".

Much technological unemployment, caused by the replacement of workers by machines might be counted as structural unemployment. Alternatively, technological unemployment might refer to the way in which steady increases in labour productivity mean that fewer workers are needed to produce the same level of output every year. The fact that aggregate demand can be raised to deal with the problem suggests that the problem is instead one of cyclical unemployment. As indicated by Okun's law, the demand side must grow sufficiently quickly to absorb not only the growing labour force but also the workers who are made redundant by the increased labour productivity.

Seasonal unemployment may be seen as a kind of structural unemployment since it is linked to certain kinds of jobs (construction and migratory farm work). The most-cited official unemployment measures erase this kind of unemployment from the statistics using "seasonal adjustment" techniques. That results in substantial and permanent structural unemployment.

=== Frictional unemployment ===
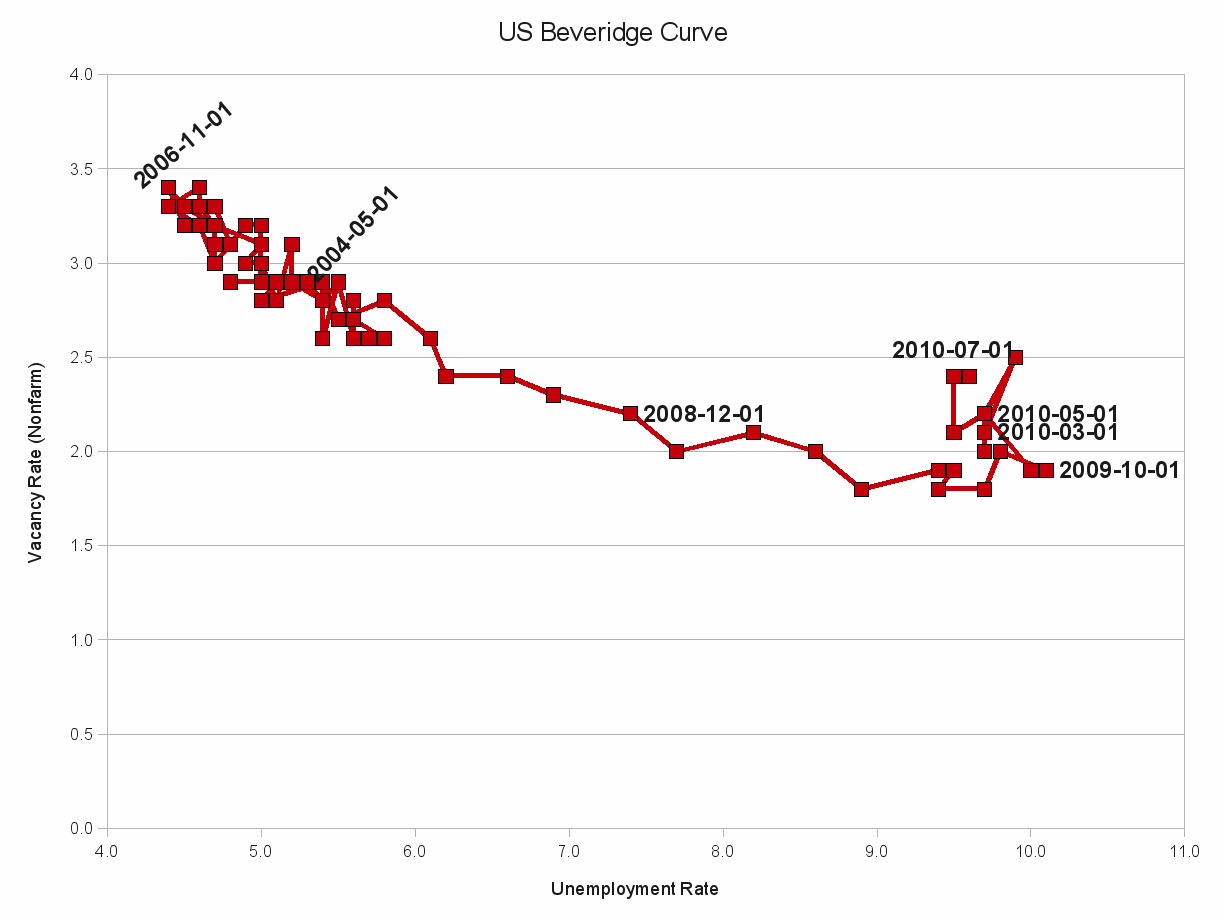
The Beveridge curve of 2004 job vacancy and unemployment rate (from the US Bureau of Labor Statistics)

Frictional unemployment is the time period between jobs in which a worker searches for or transitions from one job to another. It is sometimes called search unemployment and can be voluntary, based on the circumstances of the unemployed individual. Frictional unemployment exists because both jobs and workers are heterogeneous, and a mismatch can result between the characteristics of supply and demand. Such a mismatch can be related to skills, payment, work-time, location, seasonal industries, attitude, taste, and a multitude of other factors. New entrants (such as graduating students) and re-entrants (such as former homemakers) can also suffer a spell of frictional unemployment.

Workers and employers accept a certain level of imperfection, risk or compromise, but usually not right away. They will invest some time and effort to find a better match. That is, in fact, beneficial to the economy since it results in a better allocation of resources. However, if the search takes too long and mismatches are too frequent, the economy suffers since some work will not get done. Therefore, governments will seek ways to reduce unnecessary frictional unemployment by multiple means including providing education, advice, training, and assistance such as daycare centers.

The frictions in the labour market are sometimes illustrated graphically with a Beveridge curve, a downward-sloping, convex curve that shows a correlation between the unemployment rate on one axis and the vacancy rate on the other. Changes in the supply of or demand for labour cause movements along the curve. An increase or decrease in labour market frictions will shift the curve outwards or inwards.

=== Hidden unemployment ===
Official statistics often underestimate unemployment rates because of hidden, or covered, unemployment. That is the unemployment of potential workers that are not reflected in official unemployment statistics because of how the statistics are collected. In many countries, only those who have no work but are actively looking for work or qualifying for social security benefits are counted as unemployed. Those who have given up looking for work and sometimes those who are on government "retraining" programs are not officially counted among the unemployed even though they are not employed.

The statistic also does not count the "underemployed", those working fewer hours than they would prefer or in a job that fails to make good use of their capabilities. In addition, those who are of working age but are currently in full-time education are usually not considered unemployed in government statistics. Traditional unemployed native societies who survive by gathering, hunting, herding, and farming in wilderness areas may or may not be counted in unemployment statistics.

=== Long-term unemployment ===
Long-term unemployment (LTU) is defined in European Union statistics as unemployment lasting for longer than one year (while unemployment lasting over two years is defined as very long-term unemployment). The United States Bureau of Labor Statistics (BLS), which reports current long-term unemployment rate at 1.9 percent, defines this as unemployment lasting 27 weeks or longer. Long-term unemployment is a component of structural unemployment, which results in long-term unemployment existing in every social group, industry, occupation, and all levels of education.

In 2015 the European Commission published recommendations on how to reduce long-term unemployment. These advised governments to:

- encourage long-term unemployed people to register with an employment service;
- provide each registered long-term unemployed person with an individual in-depth assessment to identify their needs and potential within 18 months;
- offer a tailor-made job integration agreement (JIA) to all registered long-term unemployed within 18 months. These might include measures such as mentoring, help with job search, further education and training, support for housing, transport, child and care services and rehabilitation. Each person would have a single point of contact to access this support, which would be implemented in partnership with employers.

In 2017–2019 it implemented the Long-Term Unemployment project to research solutions implemented by EU member states and produce a toolkit to guide government action. Progress was evaluated in 2019.

=== Marxian theory of unemployment ===
Marxists share the Keynesian viewpoint of the relationship between economic demand and employment, but with the caveat that the market system's propensity to slash wages and reduce labor participation on an enterprise level causes a requisite decrease in aggregate demand in the economy as a whole, causing crises of unemployment and periods of low economic activity before the capital accumulation (investment) phase of economic growth can continue. According to Karl Marx, unemployment is inherent within the unstable capitalist system and periodic crises of mass unemployment are to be expected. He theorized that unemployment was inevitable and even a necessary part of the capitalist system, with recovery and regrowth also part of the process. The function of the proletariat within the capitalist system is to provide a "reserve army of labour" that creates downward pressure on wages. This is accomplished by dividing the proletariat into surplus labour (employees) and under-employment (unemployed). This reserve army of labour fight among themselves for scarce jobs at lower and lower wages. At first glance, unemployment seems inefficient since unemployed workers do not increase profits, but unemployment is profitable within the global capitalist system because unemployment lowers wages which are costs from the perspective of the owners. From this perspective low wages benefit the system by reducing economic rents. Yet, it does not benefit workers; according to Karl Marx, the workers (proletariat) work to benefit the bourgeoisie through their production of capital. Capitalist systems unfairly manipulate the market for labour by perpetuating unemployment which lowers laborers' demands for fair wages. Workers are pitted against one another at the service of increasing profits for owners. As a result of the capitalist mode of production, Marx argued that workers experienced alienation and estrangement through their economic identity. According to Marx, the only way to permanently eliminate unemployment would be to abolish capitalism and the system of forced competition for wages and then shift to a socialist or communist economic system. For contemporary Marxists, the existence of persistent unemployment is proof of the inability of capitalism to ensure full employment.

=== Labor force participation rate ===
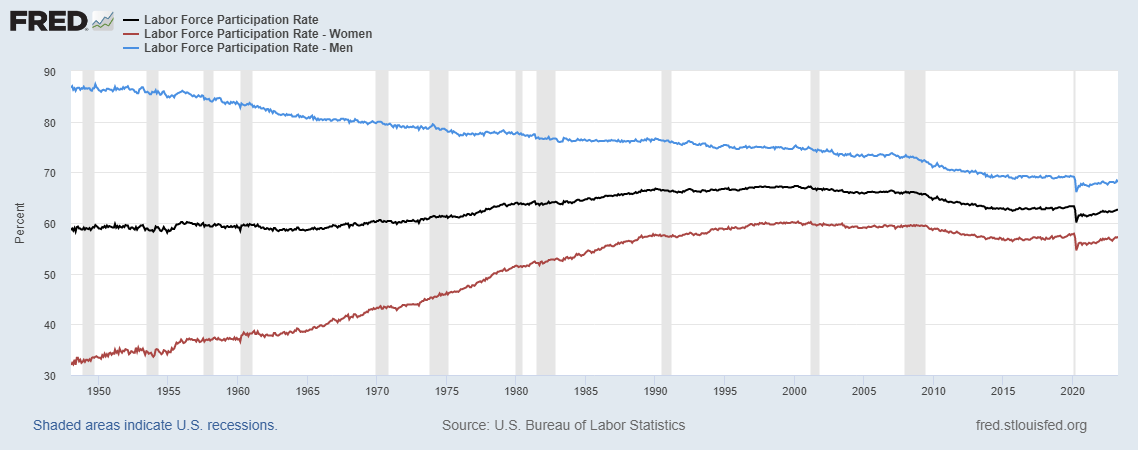
US labor force participation rate from 1948 to 2021, by gender Male participation Total labor force participation Female participation

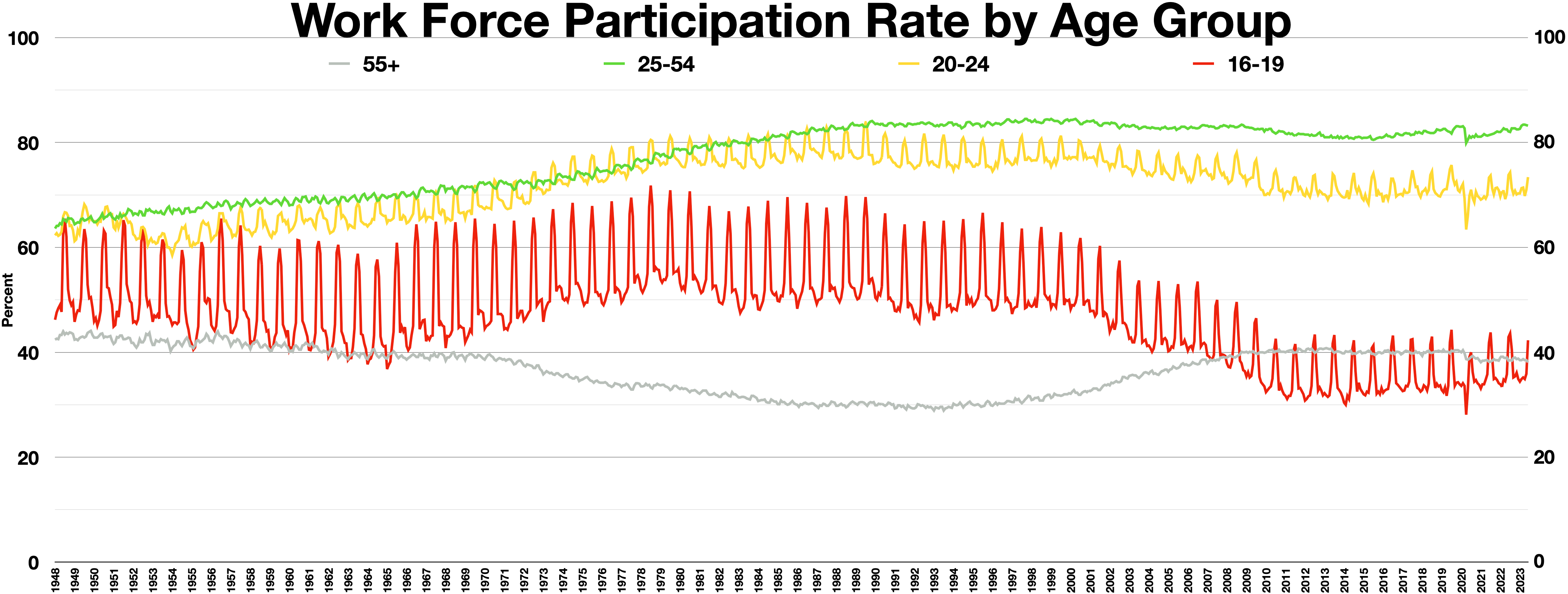
US Work Force Participation Rate by Age Group 55+ 25-54 20-24 16-19

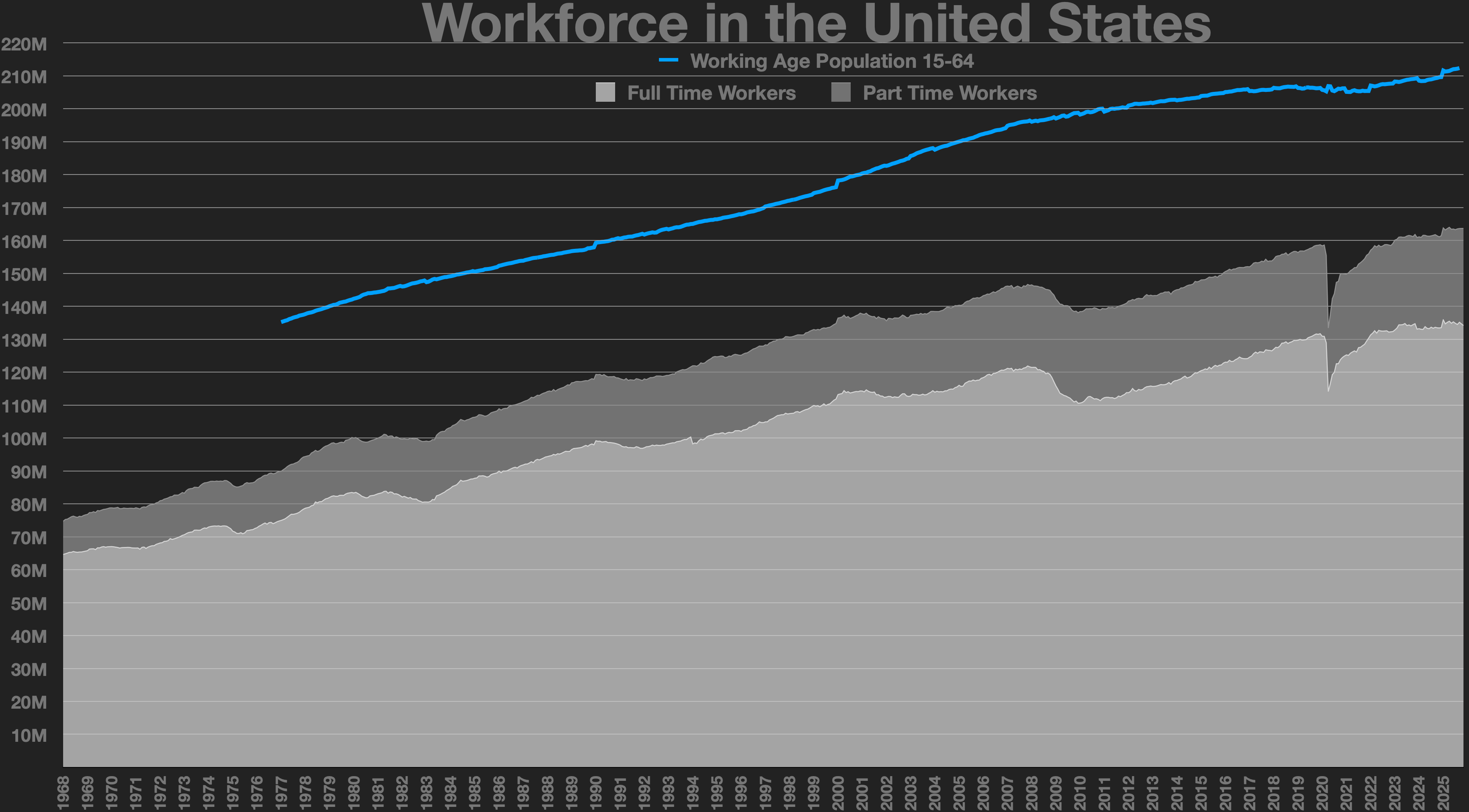
Workforce in the United States Working age population 15-64 Part time employment Full time employment

The labor force participation rate is the ratio between the labor force and the overall size of their cohort (national population of the same age range). In the West, during the latter half of the 20th century, the labor force participation rate increased significantly because of an increase in the number of women entering the workplace.

In the United States, there have been four significant stages of women's participation in the labour force: increases in the 20th century and decreases in the 21st century. Male labor force participation decreased from 1953 to 2013. Since October 2013, men have been increasingly joining the labour force.

From the late 19th century to the 1920s, very few women worked outside the home. They were young single women who typically withdrew from the labor force at marriage unless family needed two incomes. Such women worked primarily in the textile manufacturing industry or as domestic workers. That profession empowered women and allowed them to earn a living wage. At times, they were a financial help to their families.

Between 1930 and 1950, female labor force participation increased primarily because of the increased demand for office workers, women's participation in the high school movement, and electrification, which reduced the time that was spent on household chores. From the 1950s to the early 1970s, most women were secondary earners working mainly as secretaries, teachers, nurses, and librarians (pink-collar jobs).

From the mid-1970s to the late 1990s, there was a period of revolution of women in the labor force brought on by various factors, many of which arose from the second-wave feminism movement. Women more accurately planned for their future in the work force by investing in more applicable majors in college that prepared them to enter and compete in the labor market. In the United States, the female labor force participation rate rose from approximately 33% in 1948 to a peak of 60.3% in 2000. As of April 2015, the female labor force participation is at 56.6%, the male labor force participation rate is at 69.4%, and the total is 62.8%.

A common theory in modern economics claims that the rise of women participating in the US labor force in the 1950s to the 1990s was caused by the introduction of a new contraceptive technology, birth control pills, as well as the adjustment of age of majority laws. The use of birth control gave women the flexibility of opting to invest and to advance their career while they maintained a relationship. By having control over the timing of their fertility, they were not running a risk of thwarting their career choices. However, only 40% of the population actually used the birth control pill.

That implies that other factors may have contributed to women choosing to invest in advancing their careers. One factor may be that an increasing number of men delayed the age of marriage, which allowed women to marry later in life without them worrying about the quality of older men. Other factors include the changing nature of work, with machines replacing physical labor, thus eliminating many traditional male occupations, and the rise of the service sector in which many jobs are gender neutral.

Another factor that may have contributed to the trend was the Equal Pay Act of 1963, which aimed at abolishing wage disparity based on sex. Such legislation diminished sexual discrimination and encouraged more women to enter the labor market by receiving fair remuneration to help raising families and children.

At the turn of the 21st century, the labor force participation began to reverse its long period of increase. Reasons for the change include a rising share of older workers, an increase in school enrollment rates among young workers, and a decrease in female labor force participation.

The labor force participation rate can decrease when the rate of growth of the population outweighs that of the employed and the unemployed together. The labor force participation rate is a key component in long-term economic growth, almost as important as productivity.

A historic shift began around the end of the Great Recession as women began leaving the labor force in the United States and other developed countries. The female labor force participation rate in the United States has steadily decreased since 2009, and as of April 2015, the female labor force participation rate has gone back down to 1988 levels of 56.6%.

Participation rates are defined as follows:

Pop = total population	LF = labor force = U + E
LFpop = labor force population (generally defined as all men and women aged 15–64)	p = participation rate = LF / LFpop
E = number employed	e = rate of employment = E / LFpop
U = number of unemployed	u = rate of unemployment = U / LF

The labor force participation rate explains how an increase in the unemployment rate can occur simultaneously with an increase in employment. If a large number of new workers enter the labor force but only a small fraction become employed, then the increase in the number of unemployed workers can outpace the growth in employment.

=== Unemployment-to-population ratio ===
The unemployment-to-population ratio calculates the share of unemployed for the whole population. This is in contrast to the unemployment rate, which calculates the percentage of unemployed persons in relation to the active population. Particularly, many young people between 15 and 24 are studying full-time and so are neither working nor looking for a job. That means that they are not part of the labor force, which is used as the denominator when the unemployment rate is calculated.

=== NEET ===
Youth not in education, employment or training

A NEET (/niːt/ "neat"), an acronym for "Not in Education, Employment, or Training", is a person who is unemployed and not receiving an education or vocational training. The classification originated in the United Kingdom in the late 1990s, and its use has spread, in varying degrees, to other countries, including Canada, China, Japan, Serbia, South Korea and the United States. The NEET category includes the unemployed (individuals without a job and seeking one), as well as individuals outside the labour force (without a job and not seeking one). It is usually age-bounded to exclude people in old-age retirement. NEET frequently refers to youth or young adults, where NEET is distinct from youth unemployment. Generations with high NEET have been described as lost generations.

=== Youth and young adult unemployment ===
Youth unemployment refers to unemployment among people aged 15-24, while young adult unemployment refers to unemployment among ages 25-34. Youth unemployment is in many countries higher than general unemployment. Unemployment of young adults was associated with political instability and revolutions.

== Measurement ==
There are also different ways national statistical agencies measure unemployment. The differences may limit the validity of international comparisons of unemployment data. To some degree, the differences remain despite national statistical agencies increasingly adopting the definition of unemployment of the International Labour Organization. To facilitate international comparisons, some organizations, such as the OECD, Eurostat, and International Labor Comparisons Program, adjust data on unemployment for comparability across countries.

Though many people care about the number of unemployed individuals, economists typically focus on the unemployment rate, which corrects for the normal increase in the number of people employed caused by increases in population and increases in the labour force relative to the population. The unemployment rate is expressed as a percentage and calculated as follows:

$$\text{Unemployment rate}=\frac{\text{Unemployed workers}}{\text{Total labor force}} \times 100$$

As defined by the International Labour Organization, "unemployed workers" are those who are currently not working but are willing and able to work for pay, currently available to work, and have actively searched for work. Individuals who are actively seeking job placement must make the effort to be in contact with an employer, have job interviews, contact job placement agencies, send out resumes, submit applications, respond to advertisements, or some other means of active job searching within the prior four weeks. Simply looking at advertisements and not responding will not count as actively seeking job placement. Since not all unemployment may be "open" and counted by government agencies, official statistics on unemployment may not be accurate. In the United States, for example, the unemployment rate does not take into consideration part-time workers, or those individuals who are not actively looking for employment, due to attending college or having tried to find a job and given up.

According to the OECD, Eurostat, and the US Bureau of Labor Statistics the unemployment rate is the number of unemployed people as a percentage of the labour force.

"An unemployed person is defined by Eurostat, according to the guidelines of the International Labour Organization, as:

- Someone aged 15 to 74 (in Italy, Spain, the United Kingdom, Iceland, Norway: 16 to 74 years);
- Without work during the reference week;
- Available to start work within the next two weeks (or has already found a job to start within the next three months);
- Actively having sought employment at some time during the last four weeks."

The labour force, or workforce, includes both employed (employees and self-employed) and unemployed people but not the economically inactive, such as pre-school children, school children, students and pensioners.

The unemployment rate of an individual country is usually calculated and reported on a monthly, quarterly, and yearly basis by the National Agency of Statistics. Organisations like the OECD report statistics for all of its member states.

Certain countries provide unemployment compensation for a certain period of time for unemployed citizens who are registered as unemployed at the government employment agency. Furthermore, pension receivables or claims could depend on the registration at the government employment agency.

In many countries like in Germany, the unemployment rate is based on the number of people who are registered as unemployed. Other countries like the United States use a labour force survey to calculate the unemployment rate.

The ILO describes four different methods to calculate the unemployment rate:

- Labour Force Sample Surveys are the most preferred method of unemployment rate calculation since they give the most comprehensive results and enables calculation of unemployment by different group categories such as race and gender. This method is the most internationally comparable.
- Official Estimates are determined by a combination of information from one or more of the other three methods. The use of this method has been declining in favor of labour surveys.
- Social Insurance Statistics, such as unemployment benefits, are computed based on the number of persons insured representing the total labour force and the number of persons who are insured that are collecting benefits. This method has been heavily criticized because of the expiration of benefits before the person finds work.
- Employment Office Statistics are the least effective since they include only a monthly tally of unemployed persons who enter employment offices. This method also includes those who are not unemployed by the ILO definition.

The primary measure of unemployment, U3, allows for comparisons between countries. Unemployment differs from country to country and across different time periods. For example, in the 1990s and 2000s, the United States had lower unemployment levels than many countries in the European Union, which had significant internal variation, with countries like the United Kingdom and Denmark outperforming Italy and France. However, large economic events like the Great Depression can lead to similar unemployment rates across the globe.

In 2013, the ILO adopted a resolution to introduce new indicators to measure the unemployment rate.

- LU1: Unemployment rate: [persons in unemployment / labour force] × 100
- LU2: Combined rate of time-related underemployment and unemployment: [(persons in time-related underemployment + persons in unemployment) / labour force] x 100
- LU3: Combined rate of unemployment and potential labour force: [(persons in unemployment + potential labour force) / (extended labour force)] × 100
- LU4: Composite measure of labour underutilization: [(persons in time-related underemployment + persons in unemployment + potential

labour force) / (extended labour force)] × 100

=== European Union (Eurostat) ===
Unemployment in Europe (2021) according to Worldbank

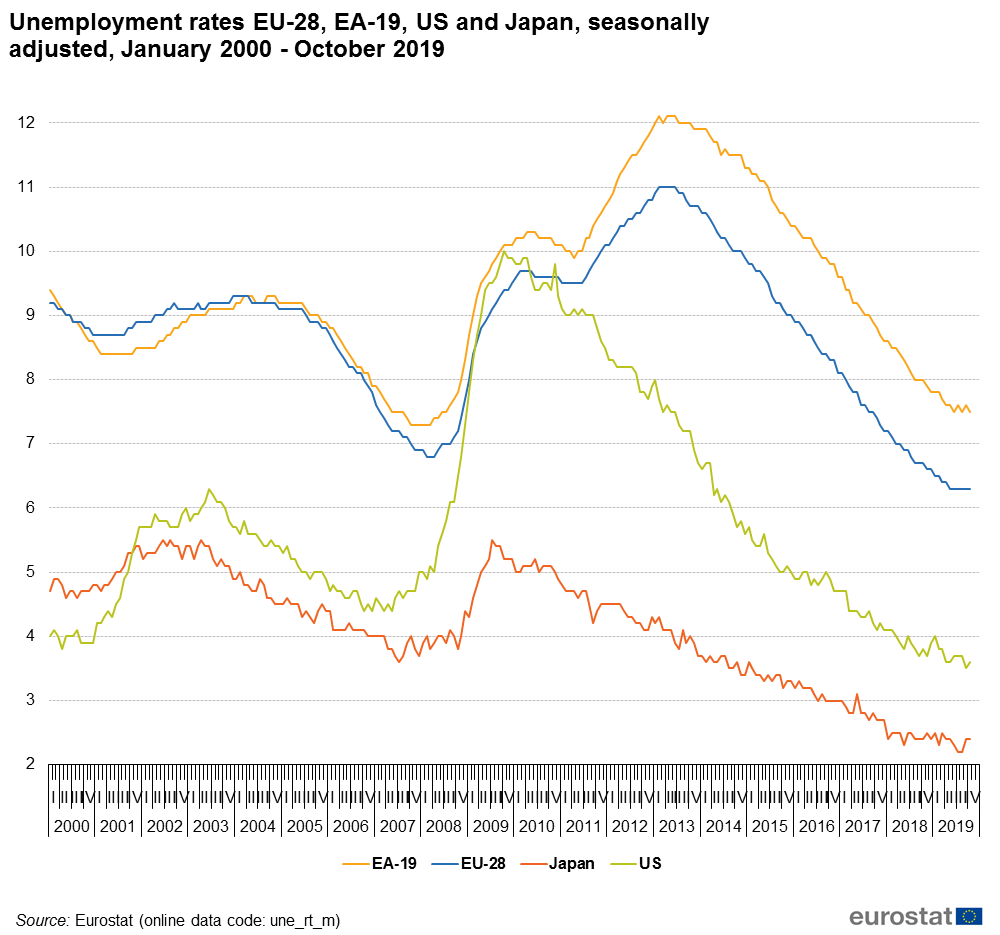
Unemployment rates from 2000 to 2019 for United States, Japan and European Union

Eurostat, the statistical office of the European Union, defines unemployed as those persons between age 15 and 74 who are not working, have looked for work in the last four weeks, and are ready to start work within two weeks; this definition conforms to ILO standards. Both the actual count and the unemployment rate are reported. Statistical data are available by member state for the European Union as a whole (EU28) as well as for the eurozone (EA19). Eurostat also includes a long-term unemployment rate, which is defined as part of the unemployed who have been unemployed for more than one year.

The main source used is the European Union Labour Force Survey (EU-LFS). It collects data on all member states each quarter. For monthly calculations, national surveys or national registers from employment offices are used in conjunction with quarterly EU-LFS data. The exact calculation for individual countries, resulting in harmonized monthly data, depends on the availability of the data.

=== United States Bureau of Labor statistics ===
Unemployment rate in the US by county in 2008 1.2–3% 3.1–4% 4.1–5% 5.1–6% 6.1–7% 7.1–8% 8.1–9% 9.1–10% 10.1–11% 11.1–13% 13.1–22.9%

The Bureau of Labor Statistics measures employment and unemployment (of those over 17 years of age) by using two different labor force surveys conducted by the United States Census Bureau (within the United States Department of Commerce) and/or the Bureau of Labor Statistics (within the United States Department of Labor) that gather employment statistics monthly. The Current Population Survey (CPS), or "Household Survey", conducts a survey based on a sample of 60,000 households. The survey measures the unemployment rate based on the ILO definition.

The Current Employment Statistics survey (CES), or "Payroll Survey", conducts a survey based on a sample of 160,000 businesses and government agencies, which represent 400,000 individual employers. Since the survey measures only civilian nonagricultural employment, it does not calculate an unemployment rate, and it differs from the ILO unemployment rate definition. Both sources have different classification criteria and usually produce differing results. Additional data are also available from the government, such as the unemployment insurance weekly claims report available from the Office of Workforce Security, within the U.S. Department of Labor's Employment and Training Administration. The Bureau of Labor Statistics provides up-to-date numbers via a PDF linked here. The BLS also provides a readable concise current Employment Situation Summary, updated monthly.

U1–U6 since 1950, as reported by the Bureau of Labor Statistics

The Bureau of Labor Statistics also calculates six alternate measures of unemployment, U1 to U6, which measure different aspects of unemployment:

- U1: Percentage of labor force unemployed 15 weeks or longer.
- U2: Percentage of labor force who lost jobs or completed temporary work.
- U3: Official unemployment rate, per the ILO definition, occurs when people are without jobs and they have actively looked for work within the past four weeks.
- U4: U3 + "discouraged workers", or those who have stopped looking for work because current economic conditions make them believe that no work is available for them.
- U5: U4 + other "marginally attached workers," or "loosely attached workers", or those who "would like" and are able to work but have not looked for work recently.
- U6: U5 + Part-time workers who want to work full-time, but cannot for economic reasons (underemployment).

Note: "Marginally attached workers" are added to the total labour force for unemployment rate calculation for U4, U5, and U6. The BLS revised the CPS in 1994 and among the changes the measure representing the official unemployment rate was renamed U3 instead of U5. In 2013, Representative Hunter proposed that the Bureau of Labor Statistics use the U5 rate instead of the current U3 rate.

Statistics for the US economy as a whole hide variations among groups. For example, in January 2008, the US unemployment rates were 4.4% for adult men, 4.2% for adult women, 4.4% for Caucasians, 6.3% for Hispanics or Latinos (all races), 9.2% for African Americans, 3.2% for Asian Americans, and 18.0% for teenagers. Also, the US unemployment rate would be at least 2% higher if prisoners and jail inmates were counted.

The unemployment rate is included in a number of major economic indices including the US Conference Board's Index of Leading Indicators a macroeconomic measure of the state of the economy.

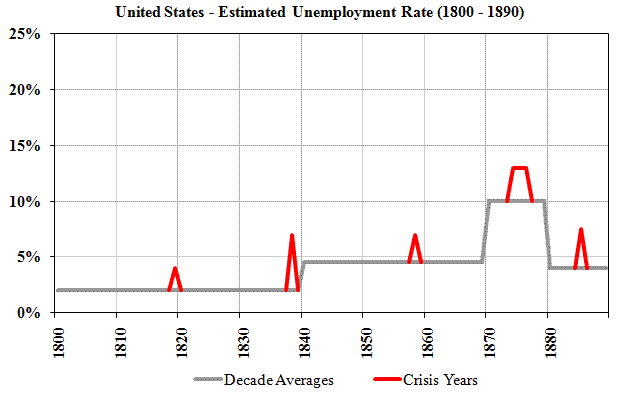
Estimated US unemployment rate from 1800 to 1890. All data are estimates based on data compiled by Lebergott. See limitations section below on how to interpret unemployment statistics in self-employed, agricultural economies. See image information for complete data.

Estimated US unemployment rate since 1890; 1890–1930 data are from Christina Romer. 1930–1940 data is from Coen. 1940–2011 data is from Bureau of Labor Statistics. See image info for complete data.

Unemployment rate in the United States, monthly since 1948

=== Limitations of definition ===
Some critics believe that current methods of measuring unemployment are inaccurate in terms of the impact of unemployment on people as these methods do not take into account the 1.5% of the available working population incarcerated in US prisons (who may or may not be working while they are incarcerated); those who have lost their jobs and have become discouraged over time from actively looking for work; those who are self-employed or wish to become self-employed, such as tradesmen or building contractors or information technology consultants; those who have retired before the official retirement age but would still like to work (involuntary early retirees); those on disability pensions who do not possess full health but still wish to work in occupations suitable for their medical conditions; or those who work for payment for as little as one hour per week but would like to work full time.

The last people are "involuntary part-time" workers, those who are underemployed, such as a computer programmer who is working in a retail store until they can find a permanent job, involuntary stay-at-home mothers who would prefer to work, and graduate and professional school students who are unable to find worthwhile jobs after they graduated with their bachelor's degrees.

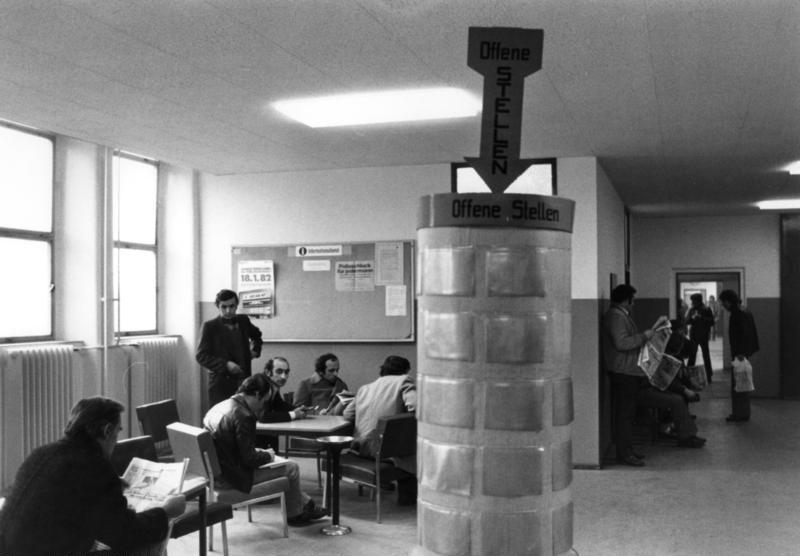
A government unemployment office with job listings, West Berlin, West Germany, 1982

Internationally, some nations' unemployment rates are sometimes muted or appear less severe because of the number of self-employed individuals working in agriculture. Small independent farmers are often considered self-employed and so cannot be unemployed. That can impact non-industrialized economies, such as the United States and Europe in the early 19th century, since overall unemployment was approximately 3% because so many individuals were self-employed, independent farmers; however, non-agricultural unemployment was as high as 80%.

Unemployment in official accounts has been estimated to be under-reported by between 1% and 4%.

Many economies industrialize and so experience increasing numbers of non-agricultural workers. For example, the United States' non-agricultural labour force increased from 20% in 1800 to 50% in 1850 and 97% in 2000. The shift away from self-employment increases the percentage of the population that is included in unemployment rates. When unemployment rates between countries or time periods are compared, it is best to consider differences in their levels of industrialization and self-employment.

Additionally, the measures of employment and unemployment may be "too high". In some countries, the availability of unemployment benefits can inflate statistics by giving an incentive to register as unemployed. People who do not seek work may choose to declare themselves unemployed to get benefits; people with undeclared paid occupations may try to get unemployment benefits in addition to the money that they earn from their work.

However, in the United States, Canada, Mexico, Australia, Japan, and the European Union, unemployment is measured using a sample survey (akin to a Gallup poll). According to the BLS, a number of Eastern European nations have instituted labour force surveys as well. The sample survey has its own problems because the total number of workers in the economy is calculated based on a sample, rather than a census.

It is possible to be neither employed nor unemployed by ILO definitions by being outside of the "labour force". Such people have no job and are not looking for one. Many of them go to school or are retired. Family responsibilities keep others out of the labour force. Still others have a physical or mental disability that prevents them from participating in the labour force. Some people simply elect not to work and prefer to be dependent on others for sustenance.

Typically, employment and the labour force include only work that is done for monetary gain. Hence, a homemaker is neither part of the labour force nor unemployed. Also, full-time students and prisoners are considered to be neither part of the labour force nor unemployed. The number of prisoners can be important. In 1999, economists Lawrence F. Katz and Alan B. Krueger estimated that increased incarceration lowered measured unemployment in the United States by 0.17% between 1985 and the late 1990s.

In particular, as of 2005, roughly 0.7% of the US population is incarcerated (1.5% of the available working population). Additionally, children, the elderly, and some individuals with disabilities are typically not counted as part of the labour force and so are not included in the unemployment statistics. However, some elderly and many disabled individuals are active in the labour market.

In the early stages of an economic boom, unemployment often rises. That is because people join the labour market (give up studying, start a job hunt, etc.) as a result of the improving job market, but until they have actually found a position, they are counted as unemployed. Similarly, during a recession, the increase in the unemployment rate is moderated by people leaving the labour force or being otherwise discounted from the labour force, such as with the self-employed.

For the fourth quarter of 2004, according to OECD (Employment Outlook 2005 ISBN 92-64-01045-9), normalized unemployment for men aged 25 to 54 was 4.6% in the US and 7.4% in France. At the same time and for the same population, the employment rate (number of workers divided by population) was 86.3% in the US and 86.7% in France. That example shows that the unemployment rate was 60% higher in France than in the US, but more people in that demographic were working in France than in the US, which is counterintuitive if it is expected that the unemployment rate reflects the health of the labour market.

Those deficiencies make many labour market economists prefer to look at a range of economic statistics such as labour market participation rate, the percentage of people between 15 and 64 who are currently employed or searching for employment, the total number of full-time jobs in an economy, the number of people seeking work as a raw number and not a percentage, and the total number of person-hours worked in a month compared to the total number of person-hours people would like to work. In particular, the National Bureau of Economic Research does not use the unemployment rate but prefers various employment rates to date recessions. Moreover, some articles in prestigious magazines such as The Economist have argued that alternative ways to measure economic misery are needed.

== Effects ==
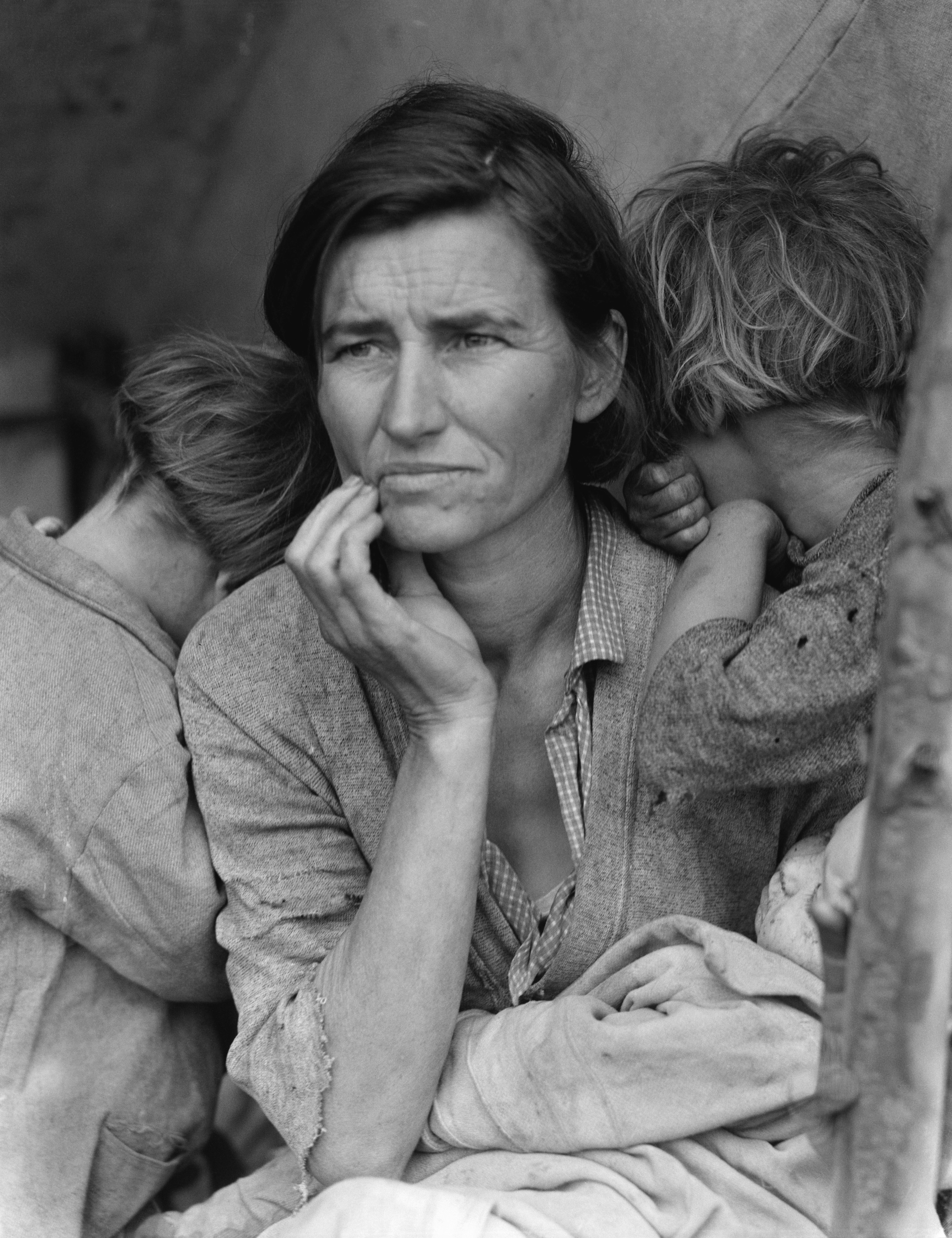
Migrant Mother, photograph by Dorothea Lange, 1936

High and the persistent unemployment has a negative effect on subsequent long-run economic growth. Unemployment can harm growth because it is a waste of resources; generates redistributive pressures and subsequent distortions; drives people to poverty; constrains liquidity limiting labor mobility; and erodes self-esteem promoting social dislocation, unrest, and conflict.

=== Costs ===
==== Individual ====
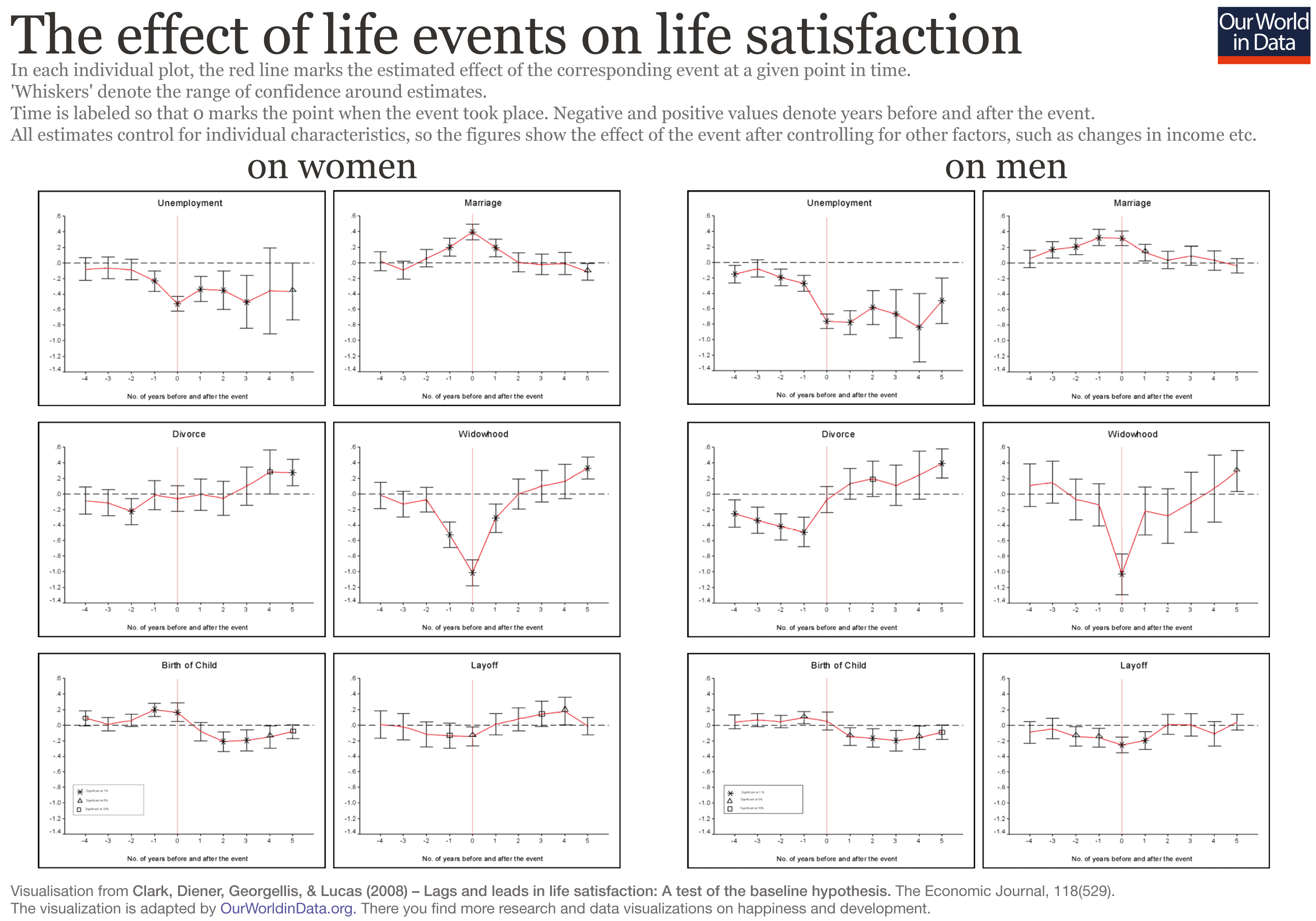
The effect of various life events on life satisfaction. Unemployment is one of the events with the most long-lasting negative effects on life satisfaction.

Unemployed individuals are unable to earn money to meet financial obligations. Failure to pay mortgage payments or to pay rent may lead to homelessness through foreclosure or eviction. Across the United States the growing ranks of people made homeless in the foreclosure crisis are generating tent cities.

Unemployment increases susceptibility to cardiovascular disease, somatization, anxiety disorders, depression, and suicide. In addition, unemployed people have higher rates of medication use, poor diet, physician visits, tobacco smoking, alcoholic beverage consumption, drug use, and lower rates of exercise. According to a study published in Social Indicator Research, even those who tend to be optimistic find it difficult to look on the bright side of things when unemployed. Using interviews and data from German participants aged 16 to 94, including individuals coping with the stresses of real life and not just a volunteering student population, the researchers determined that even optimists struggled with being unemployed.

In 1979, M. Harvey Brenner found that for every 10% increase in the number of unemployed, there is an increase of 1.2% in total mortality, a 1.7% increase in cardiovascular disease, 1.3% more cirrhosis cases, 1.7% more suicides, 4.0% more arrests, and 0.8% more assaults reported to the police.

A study by Christopher Ruhm in 2000 on the effect of recessions on health found that several measures of health actually improve during recessions. As for the impact of an economic downturn on crime, during the Great Depression, the crime rate did not decrease. The unemployed in the US often use welfare programs such as food stamps or accumulating debt because unemployment insurance in the US generally does not replace most of the income that was received on the job, and one cannot receive such aid indefinitely.

Not everyone suffers equally from unemployment. In a prospective study of 9,570 individuals over four years, highly conscientious people suffered more than twice as much if they became unemployed. The authors suggested that may because of conscientious people making different attributions about why they became unemployed or through experiencing stronger reactions following failure. There is also the possibility of reverse causality from poor health to unemployment.

Some researchers hold that many of the low-income jobs are not really a better option than unemployment with a welfare state, with its unemployment insurance benefits. However, since it is difficult or impossible to get unemployment insurance benefits without having worked in the past, those jobs and unemployment are more complementary than they are substitutes. (They are often held short-term, either by students or by those trying to gain experience; turnover in most low-paying jobs is high.)

Another cost for the unemployed is that the combination of unemployment, lack of financial resources, and social responsibilities may push unemployed workers to take jobs that do not fit their skills or allow them to use their talents. Unemployment can cause underemployment, and fear of job loss can spur psychological anxiety. As well as anxiety, it can cause depression, lack of confidence, and huge amounts of stress, which is increased when the unemployed are faced with health issues, poverty, and lack of relational support.

Another personal cost of unemployment is its impact on relationships. A 2008 study from Covizzi, which examined the relationship between unemployment and divorce, found that the rate of divorce is greater for couples when one partner is unemployed. However, a more recent study has found that some couples often stick together in "unhappy" or "unhealthy" marriages when they are unemployed to buffer financial costs. A 2014 study by Van der Meer found that the stigma that comes from being unemployed affects personal well-being, especially for men, who often feel as though their masculine identities are threatened by unemployment.

==== Gender and age ====
Unemployment can also bring personal costs in relation to gender. One study found that women are more likely to experience unemployment than men and that they are less likely to move from temporary positions to permanent positions. Another study on gender and unemployment found that men, however, are more likely to experience greater stress, depression, and adverse effects from unemployment, largely stemming from the perceived threat to their role as breadwinner. The study found that men expect themselves to be viewed as "less manly" after a job loss than they actually are and so they engage in compensating behaviors, such as financial risk-taking and increased assertiveness. Unemployment has been linked to extremely adverse effects on men's mental health. Professor Ian Hickie of the University of Sydney said that evidence showed that men have more restricted social networks than women and that men have are heavily work-based. Therefore, the loss of a job for men means the loss of a whole set of social connections as well. That loss can then lead to men becoming socially isolated very quickly. An Australian study on the mental health impacts of graduating during an economic downturn found that the negative mental health outcomes are greater and more scarring for men than women. The effect was particularly pronounced for those with vocational or secondary education.

Costs of unemployment also vary depending on age. The young and the old are the two largest age groups currently experiencing unemployment. A 2007 study from Jacob and Kleinert found that young people (ages 18 to 24) who have fewer resources and limited work experiences are more likely to be unemployed. Other researchers have found that today's high school seniors place a lower value on work than those in the past, which is likely because they recognize the limited availability of jobs. At the other end of the age spectrum, studies have found that older individuals have more barriers than younger workers to employment, require stronger social networks to acquire work, and are also less likely to move from temporary to permanent positions. Additionally, some older people see age discrimination as the reason for them not getting hired.

==== Social ====
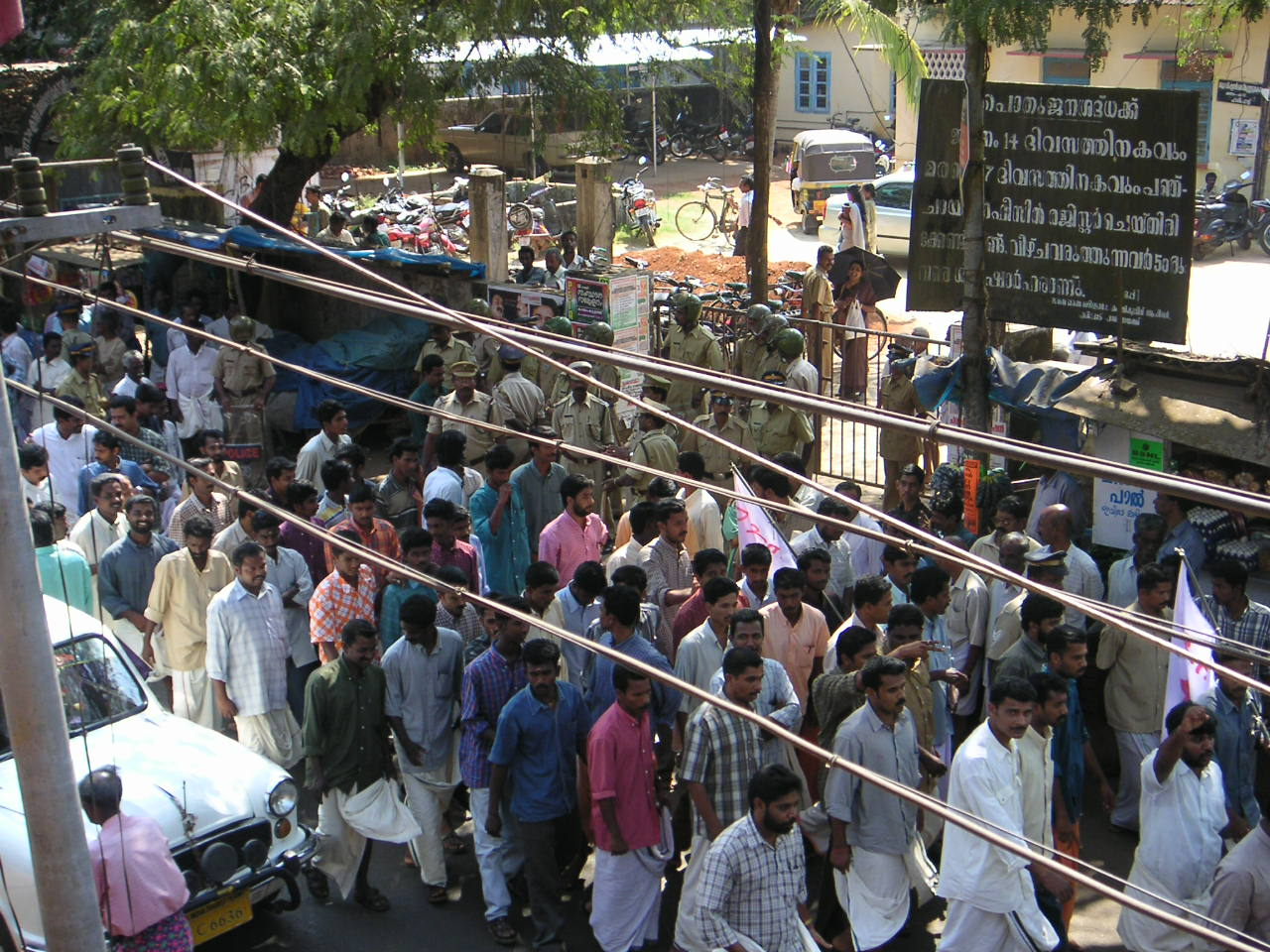
Demonstration against unemployment in Kerala, South India, India on 27 January 2004

An economy with high unemployment is not using all of the resources, specifically labour, available to it. Since it is operating below its production possibility frontier, it could have higher output if all of the workforce were usefully employed. However, there is a tradeoff between economic efficiency and unemployment: if all frictionally unemployed accepted the first job that they were offered, they would be likely to be operating at below their skill level, reducing the economy's efficiency.

During a long period of unemployment, workers can lose their skills, causing a loss of human capital. Being unemployed can also reduce the life expectancy of workers by about seven years.

High unemployment can encourage xenophobia and protectionism since workers fear that foreigners are stealing their jobs. Efforts to preserve existing jobs of domestic and native workers include legal barriers against "outsiders" who want jobs, obstacles to immigration, and/or tariffs and similar trade barriers against foreign competitors.

High unemployment can also cause social problems such as crime. If people have less disposable income than before, it is very likely that crime levels within the economy will increase.

A 2015 study published in The Lancet, estimates that unemployment causes 45,000 suicides a year globally.

==== Political ====
Unemployment can cause of civil disorder, in some cases leading to revolution, particularly totalitarianism. The fall of the Weimar Republic in 1933 and Adolf Hitler's rise to power, which culminated in World War II and the deaths of tens of millions and the destruction of much of the physical capital of Europe, is attributed to the poor economic conditions in Germany at the time, notably a high unemployment rate of above 20%.

The hyperinflation in the Weimar Republic is not directly blamed for the Nazi rise, since hyperinflation occurred primarily in 1921 to 1923, the year of Hitler's Beer Hall Putsch. Although hyperinflation has been blamed for damaging the credibility of democratic institutions, the Nazis did not assume government until 1933, ten years after the hyperinflation but in the midst of high unemployment.

A study found unemployment is associated with decreased trust in democracy. Rising unemployment has traditionally been regarded by the public and the media in any country as a key guarantor of electoral defeat for any government that oversees it. That was very much the consensus in the United Kingdom until 1983, when Thatcher won the 1983 United Kingdom general election, despite overseeing a rise in unemployment from 1.5 million to 3.2 million since the 1979 election and decreasing popular vote percentage.

=== Benefits ===
The primary benefit of unemployment is that people are available for hire, without being headhunted away from their existing employers. That permits both new and old businesses to take on staff.

Unemployment is argued to be "beneficial" to the people who are not unemployed in the sense that it averts inflation, which itself has damaging effects, by providing (in Marxian terms) a reserve army of labour, which keeps wages in check. However, the direct connection between full local employment and local inflation has been disputed by some because of the recent increase in international trade that supplies low-priced goods even while local employment rates rise to full employment.

In the Shapiro–Stiglitz model of efficiency wages, workers are paid at a level that dissuades shirking. That prevents wages from dropping to market clearing levels.

Full employment cannot be achieved because workers would shirk if they were not threatened with the possibility of unemployment. The curve for the no-shirking condition (labelled NSC) thus goes to infinity at full employment. The inflation-fighting benefits to the entire economy arising from a presumed optimum level of unemployment have been studied extensively. The Shapiro–Stiglitz model suggests that wages never bid down sufficiently to reach 0% unemployment. That occurs because employers know that when wages decrease, workers will shirk and expend less effort. Employers avoid shirking by preventing wages from decreasing so low that workers give up and become unproductive. The higher wages perpetuate unemployment, but the threat of unemployment reduces shirking.

Before current levels of world trade were developed, unemployment was shown to reduce inflation, following the Phillips curve, or to decelerate inflation, following the NAIRU/natural rate of unemployment theory since it is relatively easy to seek a new job without losing a current job. When more jobs are available for fewer workers (lower unemployment), that may allow workers to find the jobs that better fit their tastes, talents and needs.

As in the Marxian theory of unemployment, special interests may also benefit. Some employers may expect that employees with no fear of losing their jobs will not work as hard or will demand increased wages and benefit. According to that theory, unemployment may promote general labour productivity and profitability by increasing employers' rationale for their monopsony-like power (and profits).

Optimal unemployment has also been defended as an environmental tool to brake the constantly accelerated growth of the GDP to maintain levels that are sustainable in the context of resource constraints and environmental impacts. However, the tool of denying jobs to willing workers seems a blunt instrument for conserving resources and the environment. It reduces the consumption of the unemployed across the board and only in the short term. Full employment of the unemployed workforce, all focused toward the goal of developing more environmentally efficient methods for production and consumption, might provide a more significant and lasting cumulative environmental benefit and reduced resource consumption.

Some critics of the "culture of work" such as the anarchist Bob Black see employment as culturally overemphasized in modern countries. Such critics often propose quitting jobs when possible, working less, reassessing the cost of living to that end, creation of jobs that are "fun" as opposed to "work," and creating cultural norms in which work is seen as unhealthy. These people advocate an "anti-work" ethic for life.

=== Decline in work hours ===
As a result of productivity, the work week declined considerably during the 19th century By the 1920s, the average workweek in the US was 49 hours, but it was reduced to 40 hours (after which overtime premium was applied) as part of the 1933 National Industrial Recovery Act. During the Great Depression, the enormous productivity gains caused by electrification, mass production, and agricultural mechanization were believed to have ended the need for a large number of previously employed workers.

== Remedies ==
United States families on relief (in 1,000s)
	1936	1937	1938	1939	1940	1941
Workers employed
WPA	1,995	2,227	1,932	2,911	1,971	1,638
CCC and NYA	712	801	643	793	877	919
Other federal work projects	554	663	452	488	468	681
Cases on public assistance
Social security programs	602	1,306	1,852	2,132	2,308	2,517
General relief	2,946	1,484	1,611	1,647	1,570	1,206
Totals
Total families helped	5,886	5,660	5,474	6,751	5,860	5,167
Unemployed workers (BLS)	9,030	7,700	10,390	9,480	8,120	5,560
Coverage (cases/unemployed)	65%	74%	53%	71%	72%	93%

Societies try a number of different measures to get as many people as possible into work, and various societies have experienced close to full employment for extended periods, particularly during the post-World War II economic expansion. The United Kingdom in the 1950s and 1960s averaged 1.6% unemployment, and in Australia, the 1945 White Paper on Full Employment in Australia established a government policy of full employment, which lasted until the 1970s.

However, mainstream economic discussions of full employment since the 1970s suggest that attempts to reduce the level of unemployment below the natural rate of unemployment will fail but result only in less output and more inflation.

=== Demand-side solutions ===
Increases in the demand for labour move the economy along the demand curve, increasing wages and employment. The demand for labour in an economy is derived from the demand for goods and services. As such, if the demand for goods and services in the economy increases, the demand for labour will increase, increasing employment and wages.

There are many ways to stimulate demand for goods and services. Increasing wages to the working class (those more likely to spend the increased funds on goods and services, rather than various types of savings or commodity purchases) is one theory that is proposed. Increased wages are believed to be more effective in boosting demand for goods and services than central banking strategies, which put the increased money supply mostly into the hands of wealthy personnel and institutions. Monetarists suggest that increasing money supply in general increases short-term demand. As for the long-term demand, the increased demand is negated by inflation. A rise in fiscal expenditures is another strategy for boosting aggregate demand.

Providing aid to the unemployed is a strategy that is used to prevent cutbacks in consumption of goods and services, which can lead to a vicious cycle of further job losses and further decreases in consumption and demand. Many countries aid the unemployed through social welfare programs. Such unemployment benefits include unemployment insurance, unemployment compensation, welfare, and subsidies to aid in retraining. The main goal of such programs is to alleviate short-term hardships and, more importantly, to allow workers more time to search for a job.

A direct demand-side solution to unemployment is government-funded employment of the able-bodied poor. This was notably implemented in Britain from the 17th century until 1948 in the institution of the workhouse, which provided jobs for the unemployed with harsh conditions and poor wages to dissuade their use. A modern alternative is a job guarantee in which the government guarantees work at a living wage.

Temporary measures can include public works programs such as the Works Progress Administration. Government-funded employment is not widely advocated as a solution to unemployment except in times of crisis. That is attributed to the public sector jobs existence depending directly on the tax receipts from private sector employment.

In the US, the unemployment insurance allowance is based solely on previous income (not time worked, family size, etc.) and usually compensates for one third of previous income. To qualify, people must reside in their respective state for at least a year and work. The system was established by the Social Security Act of 1935. Although 90% of citizens are covered by unemployment insurance, less than 40% apply for and receive benefits. However, the number applying for and receiving benefits increases during recessions. For highly-seasonal industries, the system provides income to workers during the off-season, thus encouraging them to stay attached to the industry.

Monetary policy and fiscal policy can both be used to increase short-term growth in the economy, increasing the demand for labour and decreasing unemployment.

=== Supply-side solutions ===
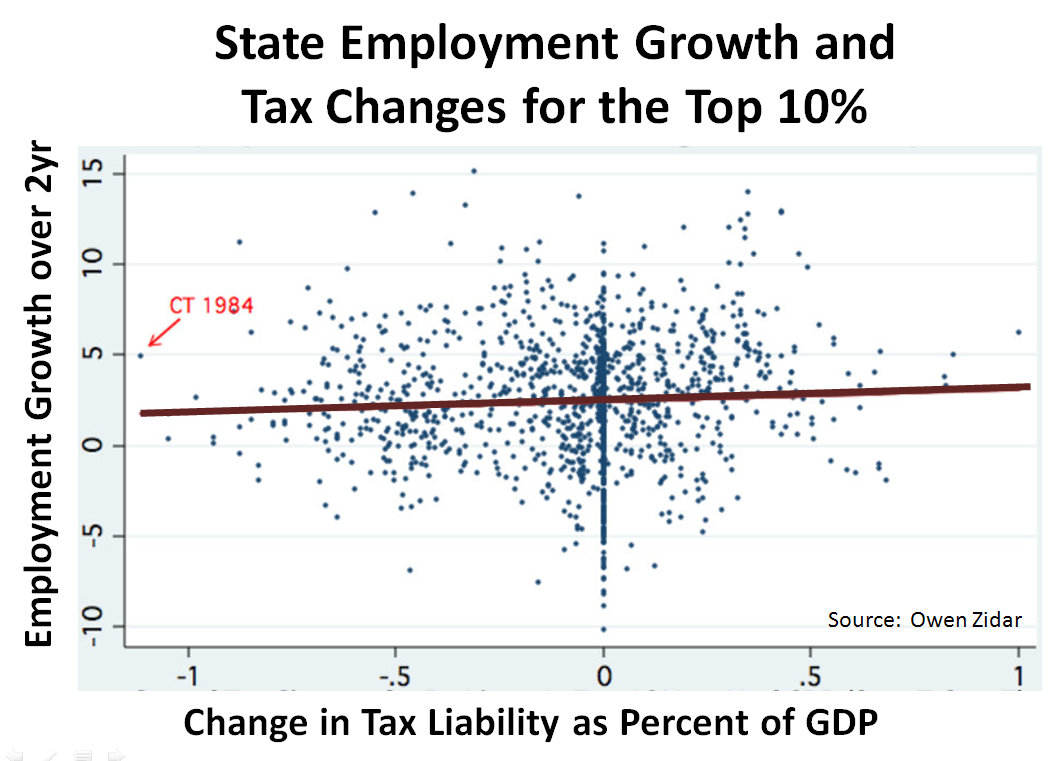
Supply-side economics proposes that lower taxes lead to employment growth.

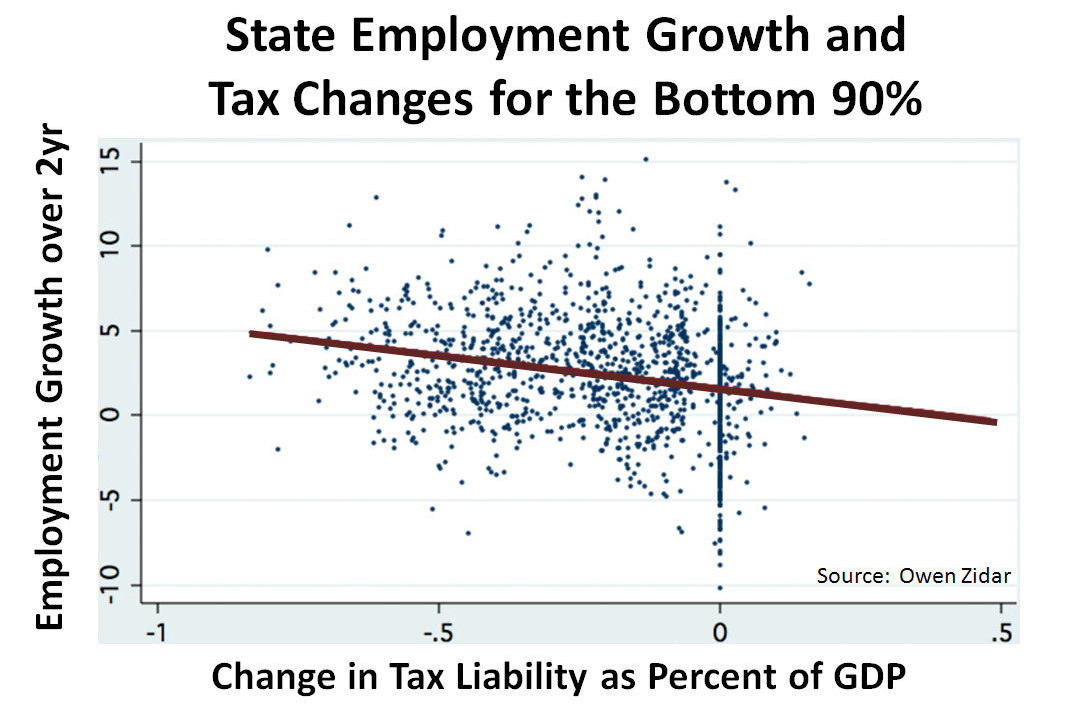
Tax decreases on high income earners (top 10%) are not correlated with employment growth, but tax decreases on lower-income earners (bottom 90%) are correlated with employment growth.

Price elasticity of labor supply has been estimated at around 0.7-1.8. Supply-side policies include making the labour market more flexible, reducing income taxes, and removing the minimum wage. Supply-siders argue that their reforms increase long-term growth, create jobs, and reduce unemployment. Other supply-side policies include education to make workers more attractive to employers.

=== Labour market flexibility ===
According to classical economic theory, markets reach equilibrium where supply equals demand; everyone who wants to sell at the market price can do so. Those who do not want to sell at that price do not; in the labour market, this is classical unemployment or reduced labor force participation. That assumes perfect competition exists in the labour market, specifically that no single entity is large enough to affect wage levels. However, the labor market is not 100% efficient although it may be more efficient than the bureaucracy. Some argue that minimum wages and regulations preventing some people from selling their labour.

== History ==
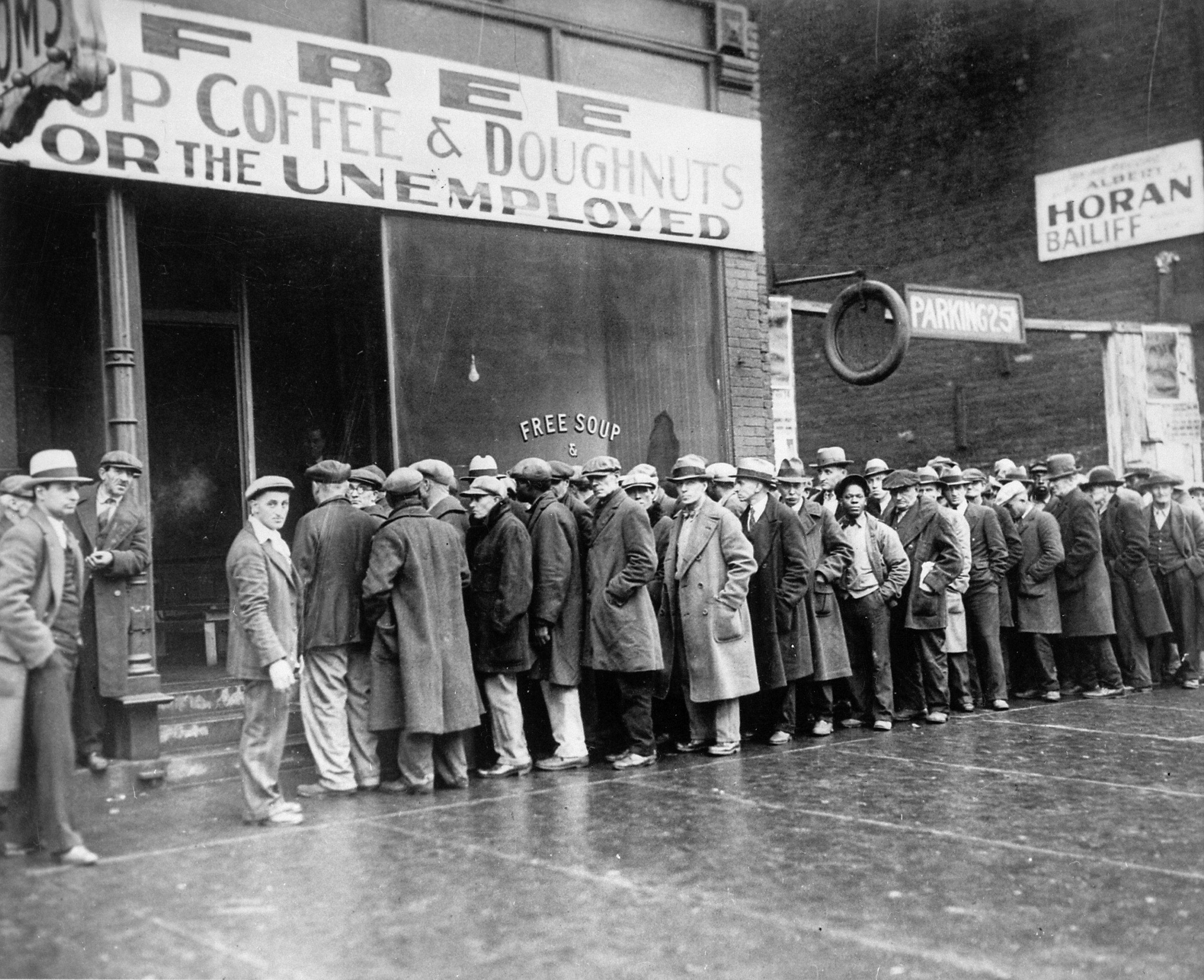
Unemployed men outside a soup kitchen in Depression-era Chicago, Illinois, United States, 1931

There are relatively limited historical records on unemployment because it has not always been acknowledged or measured systematically. Industrialization involves economies of scale, which often prevent individuals from having the capital to create their own jobs to be self-employed. An individual who cannot join an enterprise or create a job is unemployed. As individual farmers, ranchers, spinners, doctors and merchants are organized into large enterprises, those who cannot join or compete become unemployed.

Recognition of unemployment occurred slowly as economies across the world industrialized and bureaucratized. Before that, traditional self-sufficient native societies had no concept of unemployment. The recognition of the concept of "unemployment" is best exemplified through the well documented historical records in England. For example, in 16th-century, England no distinction was made between vagrants and the jobless; both were simply categorized as "sturdy beggars", who were to be punished and moved on.

=== 16th century ===
The closing of the monasteries in the 1530s increased poverty, as the Roman Catholic Church had helped the poor. In addition, there was a significant rise in enclosures during the Tudor period. Also, the population was rising. Those unable to find work had a stark choice: starve or break the law. In 1535, a bill was drawn up calling for the creation of a system of public works to deal with the problem of unemployment, which were to be funded by a tax on income and capital. A law that was passed a year later allowed vagabonds to be whipped and hanged.

In 1547, a bill was passed that subjected vagrants to some of the more extreme provisions of the criminal law: two years' servitude and branding with a "V" as the penalty for the first offense and death for the second. During the reign of Henry VIII, as many as 72,000 people are estimated to have been executed. In the 1576 Act, each town was required to provide work for the unemployed.

The Poor Relief Act 1601, one of the world's first government-sponsored welfare programs, made a clear distinction between those who were unable to work and those able-bodied people who refused employment. Under the Poor Law systems of England and Wales, Scotland and Ireland, a workhouse was a place people unable to support themselves could go to live and work.

=== Industrial Revolution to late 19th century ===
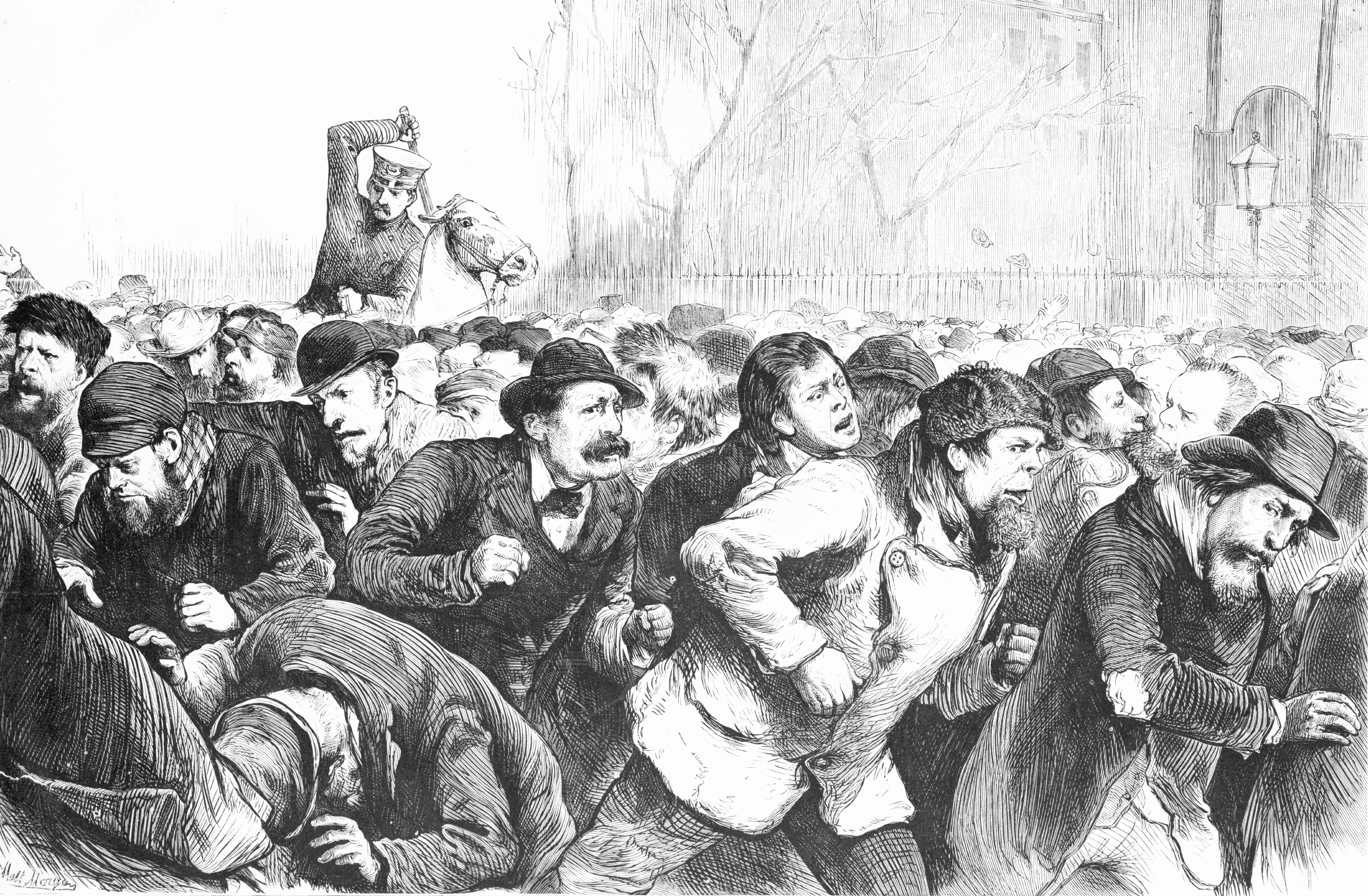
The Depression of 1873–79: Illustration of New York City police violently attacking unemployed workers in Tompkins Square Park, Manhattan, New York City, 1874

Poverty was a highly visible problem in the eighteenth century, both in cities and in the countryside. In France and Britain by the end of the century, an estimated 10 percent of the people depended on charity or begging for their food.

— Jackson J. Spielvogel, , 2008, Western Civilization: Since 1500. Cengage Learning. p.566. ISBN 0-495-50287-1

By 1776, some 1,912 parish and corporation workhouses had been established in England and Wales and housed almost 100,000 paupers.

A description of the miserable living standards of the mill workers in England in 1844 was given by Fredrick Engels in The Condition of the Working Class in England in 1844. In the preface to the 1892 edition, Engels noted that the extreme poverty he had written about in 1844 had largely disappeared. David Ames Wells also noted that living conditions in England had improved near the end of the 19th century and that unemployment was low.

The scarcity and the high price of labor in the US in the 19th century was well documented by contemporary accounts, as in the following:

"The laboring classes are comparatively few in number, but this is counterbalanced by, and indeed, may be one of the causes of the eagerness by which they call in the use of machinery in almost every department of industry. Wherever it can be applied as a substitute for manual labor, it is universally and willingly resorted to.... It is this condition of the labor market, and this eager resort to machinery wherever it can be applied, to which, under the guidance of superior education and intelligence, the remarkable prosperity of the United States is due."

— Joseph Whitworth, 1854

Scarcity of labor was a factor in the economics of slavery in the United States.

As new territories were opened and federal land sales were conducted, land had to be cleared and new homesteads established. Hundreds of thousands of immigrants annually came to the US and found jobs digging canals and building railroads. Almost all work during most of the 19th century was done by hand or with horses, mules, or oxen since there was very little mechanization. The workweek during most of the 19th century was 60 hours. Unemployment at times was between one and two percent.

The tight labor market was a factor in productivity gains by allowing workers to maintain or to increase their nominal wages during the secular deflation that caused real wages to rise at various times in the 19th century, especially in its final decades.

=== 20th century ===
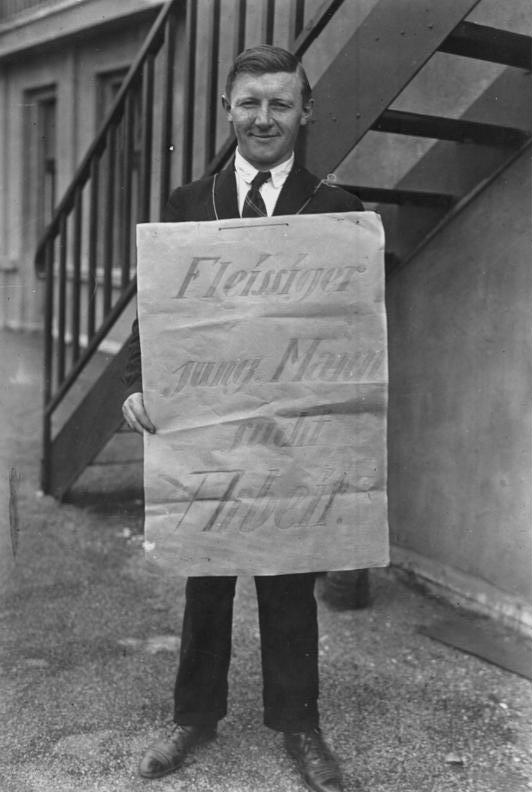
An unemployed German, 1928. Unemployment in Germany reached almost 30% of the workforce after the Great Depression.

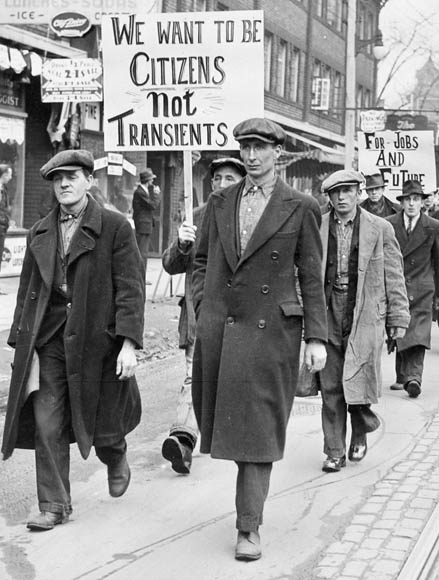
Unemployed Canadian men, marching for jobs during the Great Depression to Bathurst Street United Church, Toronto, Ontario in Canada, 1930

There were labor shortages during World War I. Ford Motor Co. doubled wages to reduce turnover. After 1925, unemployment gradually began to rise.

The 1930s saw the Great Depression impact unemployment across the globe. In Germany and the United States, the unemployment rate reached about 25% in 1932.

In some towns and cities in the northeast of England, unemployment reached as high as 70%; the national unemployment level peaked at more than 22% in 1932. Unemployment in Canada reached 27% at the depth of the Depression in 1933. In 1929, the U.S. unemployment rate averaged 3%.

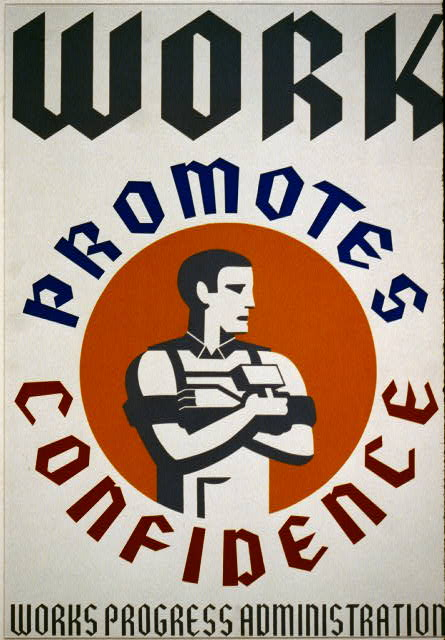
WPA poster promoting the benefits of employment

In the US, the Works Progress Administration (1935–43) was the largest make-work program. It hired men (and some women) off the relief roles ("dole") typically for unskilled labor. During the New Deal, over three million unemployed young men were taken out of their homes and placed for six months into more than 2600 work camps managed by the Civilian Conservation Corps.

Unemployment in the United Kingdom fell later in the 1930s as the Depression eased, and it remained low (in single figures) after World War II.

Fredrick Mills found that in the US, 51% of the decline in work hours was due to the fall in production and 49% was from increased productivity.

By 1972, unemployment in the United Kingdom had crept back up above 1,000,000, and it was even higher by the end of the decade, with inflation also being high. Although the monetarist economic policies of Margaret Thatcher's Conservative government saw inflation reduced after 1979, unemployment soared in the early 1980s and in 1982, it exceeded 3,000,000, a level that had not been seen for some 50 years. That represented one in eight of the workforce, with unemployment exceeding 20% in some places that had relied on declining industries such as coal mining.

However, it was a time of high unemployment in all other major industrialised nations as well. By the spring of 1983, unemployment had risen by 6% in the previous 12 months, compared to 10% in Japan, 23% in the US, and 34% in West Germany (seven years before Reunification).

Unemployment in the United Kingdom remained above 3,000,000 until the spring of 1987, when the economy enjoyed a boom. By the end of 1989, unemployment had fallen to 1,600,000. However, inflation had reached 7.8%, and the following year, it reached a nine-year high of 9.5%; leading to increased interest rates.

Another recession occurred from 1990 to 1992. Unemployment began to increase, and by the end of 1992, nearly 3,000,000 in the United Kingdom were unemployed, a number that was soon lowered by a strong economic recovery. With inflation down to 1.6% by 1993, unemployment then began to fall rapidly and stood at 1,800,000 by early 1997.

=== 21st century ===
Unemployment rate of Japan. Red line is G7 average. 15-24 age (thin line) is youth unemployment.

The official unemployment rate in the 16 European Union (EU) countries that use the euro rose to 10% in December 2009 as a result of another recession. Latvia had the highest unemployment rate in the EU, at 22.3% for November 2009. Europe's young workers have been especially hard hit. In November 2009, the unemployment rate in the EU27 for those aged 15–24 was 18.3%. For those under 25, the unemployment rate in Spain was 43.8%. Unemployment has risen in two thirds of European countries since 2010.

Into the 21st century, unemployment in the United Kingdom remained low and the economy remaining strong, and several other European economies, such as France and Germany, experienced a minor recession and a substantial rise in unemployment.

In 2008, when the recession brought on another increase in the United Kingdom, after 15 years of economic growth and no major rises in unemployment. In early 2009, unemployment passed the 2 million mark, and economists were predicting it would soon reach 3 million. However, the end of the recession was declared in January 2010 and unemployment peaked at nearly 2.7 million in 2011, appearing to ease fears of unemployment reaching 3 million. The unemployment rate of Britain's young black people was 47.4% in 2011. 2013/2014 has seen the employment rate increase from 1,935,836 to 2,173,012 as supported by showing the UK is creating more job opportunities and forecasts the rate of increase in 2014/2015 will be another 7.2%.

The Great Recession has been called a "mancession" because of the disproportionate number of men who lost their jobs as compared to women. The gender gap became wide in the United States in 2009, when 10.5% of men in the labor force were unemployed, compared with 8% of women. Three quarters of the jobs that were lost in the recession in the US were held by men.

A 26 April 2005 Asia Times article noted, "In regional giant South Africa, some 300,000 textile workers have lost their jobs in the past two years due to the influx of Chinese goods". The increasing US trade deficit with China cost 2.4 million American jobs between 2001–2008, according to a study by the Economic Policy Institute (EPI). From 2000 to 2007, the United States lost a total of 3.2 million manufacturing jobs. 12.1% of US military veterans who had served after the September 11 attacks in 2001 were unemployed as of 2011; 29.1% of male veterans aged 18–24 were unemployed. As of September 2016, the total veteran unemployment rate was 4.3 percent. By September 2017, that figure had dropped to 3 percent.

About 25,000,000 people in the world's 30 richest countries lost their jobs between the end of 2007 and the end of 2010, as the economic downturn pushed most countries into recession. In April 2010, the US unemployment rate was 9.9%, but the government's broader U-6 unemployment rate was 17.1%. In April 2012, the unemployment rate was 4.6% in Japan. In a 2012 story, the Financial Post reported, "Nearly 75 million youth are unemployed around the world, an increase of more than 4 million since 2007. In the European Union, where a debt crisis followed the financial crisis, the youth unemployment rate rose to 18% in 2011 from 12.5% in 2007, the ILO report shows." In March 2018, according to US Unemployment Rate Statistics, the unemployment rate was 4.1%, below the 4.5–5.0% norm.

In 2021, the labor force participation rate for non-white women and women with children declined significantly during the COVID-19 pandemic, with approximately 20 million women leaving the workforce. Men were not nearly as impacted, leading some to describe the phenomenon as a "she-cession".

== See also ==
- Career and Life Planning Education
- Critique of work
- Economics terminology that differs from common usage
- Effective unemployment rate
- Employment protection legislation
- Employment-to-population ratio
- Federal Reserve Economic Data (FRED)
- Global labor arbitrage
- Graduate unemployment
- HIRE Act
- Job migration
- Jobseeker's Allowance
- List of countries by long-term unemployment rate
- List of countries by unemployment rate
- List of films featuring unemployment
- List of U.S. states by unemployment rate
- List of European regions by unemployment rate
- Practice firm
- Refusal of work
- Salary inversion
- Scottish Unemployed Workers Network
- Short-time working
- Spatial mismatch
- Technological unemployment
- Unemployment extension
- Universal basic income
- Waithood
- Workfare
- Youth exclusion
