= Shapiro–Stiglitz theory =

Economic theory

In labour economics, Shapiro–Stiglitz theory of efficiency wages (or Shapiro–Stiglitz efficiency wage model) is an economic theory of wages and unemployment in labour market equilibrium. It provides a technical description of why wages are unlikely to fall and how involuntary unemployment appears. This theory was first developed by Carl Shapiro and Joseph Stiglitz.

== Introduction ==
When full employment is achieved, if a worker is sacked, he automatically finds his next job soon. In the circumstances, he does not need to exert his effort in his job, and thus full employment necessarily motivates a worker to shirk provided that he is happy with loafing on the job. Since shirking makes a firm's productivity decline, the firm needs to offer its workers higher wages to eliminate shirking. Then all firms try to eliminate shirking, which pushes up average wages and decreases employment. Hence nominal wages tend to display downward rigidity. In equilibrium, all firms pay the same wage above market clearing, and unemployment makes job loss costly, and so unemployment serves as a worker-discipline device. A jobless person cannot convince an employer that he works at a wage lower than the equilibrium wage, because the owner worries that shirking occurs after he is hired. As a result, his unemployment becomes involuntary.

== No-shirking condition ==
Suppose utility is a function of wages w and effort e like $u(w,e)=w-e$, and workers maximize the utility function with a discount rate r. Then let b be the probability per unit time that a worker is dismissed from his job, and now we introduce the expected lifetime utility $V_{u}$ of an unemployed individual. Then we find the asset value of employment during a short interval [0, T]

$$V_{e} = wT + e^{ -rT } [ bTV_{u} + (1-bT) V_{e}      ]   \; ,$$

because the worker is either dismissed or kept employed during the time. The exponential function appears, because the occasion of dismiss in the interval is once and Poisson distribution is used for the discount rate. Due to the short interval, we approximate the exponential function by 1-rT

$$V_{e} = wT + (1-rT) [ bTV_{u} + (1-bT) V_{e}      ]   \; ,$$

and simple calculation yields

$$V_{e} = \frac{wT+bTV_{u} - rbT^{2} V_{u } }{rT+bT-rbT^{2}}   \;  ,$$
$$\lim_{t \rightarrow 0} V_{e} = \frac{w + b V_{u } }{r+b}  \; .$$

Then we find the fundamental asset equation of a worker:

$$rV_{e} = w + b( V_{u} - V_{e } )   \; .$$

For a nonshirker the equation is

$$r V_{e,N} = w - e + b(V_{u} - V_{e,N} ) \; ,$$

and for a shirker

$$r V_{e,S } = w + (b+q) ( V_{u} - V_{e,S} )  \; ,$$

where q is the probability per unit time that a worker is caught shirking and sacked. Then we see

$$V_{e,N} = \frac{w-e+bV_{u } }{ r+b}   \; ,$$
$$V_{e,S} = \frac{w+ (b+q) V_{u } }{r+b+q}  \; .$$

The condition $V_{e,S} < V_{e,N}$ is called the no-shirking condition (NSC), which is expressed as

$$\hat{w} = r V_{u} + \frac{ e (r+b+q ) }{q} < w  \;  ,$$

where $\hat{w}$ is the critical wage. The worker works hard if and only if the NSC is satisfied. Thus if workers get sufficiently high wages, then the NSC is met and they will not shirk. The condition tells us that

- As the critical wage increases, cet.par., the workers exert more effort.
- As the critical wage increases, cet.par., the expected lifetime utility of an unemployed individual increases.
- As the critical wage increases, cet.par., the probability of being detected shirking decreases.
- As the critical wage increases, cet.par., the discount rate increases.
- As the critical wage increases, cet.par., the exogenous separation rate increases.

== Market equilibrium ==
Let $a$ be the probability of getting a job per unit time. In equilibrium, the flow into the unemployment pool must be equal to the flow out. Thus the probability is

$$a = \frac{bL}{N-L}  \;  ,$$

where $L$ is the aggregate employment and $N$ is the total labour supply. In reality, an employee is offered his minimum wage $\overline{w}$ or its equivalent by law. Thus the NSC becomes

$$\overline{w} + e + \frac{e(a+b+r)}{q} = \hat{w}  < w  \; ,$$

and we call it the aggregate NSC. These two yields

$$e + \overline{w} + \frac{e}{q} (  \frac{b}{u} + r ) < w    \; ,$$

where the unemployment rate is $u = \frac{N-L}{N}$. This constraint suggests that full employment always should involve shirking.

The aggregate production function $F(L)$ is a function of total effective labour force.

A firm's labour demand is given by equating the cost of hiring an additional employee to the marginal product of labour. This cost consists of wages and future unemployment benefits. Now consider the case where $\overline{w} = 0$ , then we have

$$\hat{w} =  \frac{d F(L) }{d L}  \quad .$$

In equilibrium, $F'(L)= \hat{w} = w^{* }$ holds, where $w^{* }$ is the equilibrium wage. Then the equilibrium condition becomes

$$F'(L) =  \hat{w} =  e + \frac{e}{q} ( \frac{b}{u} + r  ) = e \left(  1 +  \frac{r + b + a }{q}   \right)  \;    \; .$$

This suggests following things.

- Demand-side approach: If the employer pays less than $w^{* }$, worker's shirking becomes likely to occur (which decreases their productivity). Consequently, the wage is unlikely to decrease, and this is a microscopic mechanism of nominal rigidity. Thus, wage cannot decrease so that it can stabilize employment level, and so unemployment must increase during recession.
- Supply-side approach: Jobless persons want to work at $w^{* }$ or lower, but cannot make a credible promise not to shirk at such wages. As a result, involuntary unemployment occurs.

== Job security rules ==
The level of employment is changed by rules about job security. Consider a firm which consists of an employer and homogeneous employees. Then, suppose the profit of the firm is a function of the level of employment N, the lowest wage $W = \frac{L}{p}$ and the level of monitoring M chosen by the employer.

$$\pi = g(N) - \frac{NL}{p} - NM   ,$$

where g(N) is the production function, L is the value of on-the-job leisure from shirking, and p is the probability that an employee is caught shirking and sacked. Assume that the production function has the upper limit and its second derivative with respect to N is negative. Not to mention, the first derivative is positive. That is a reasonable assumption that the function has its upper bound in term of productivity. Consider, for instance, such a function of time as

$$f(t) = 1 - e^{-t}  .$$

Obviously its first derivative is positive, and second derivative is negative.

Let R be a measure of the difficulty of dismissing an employee who is caught shirking. Then p is a function of both R and M. The first and second derivatives of the profit with regard to N are:

$$\frac{\partial \pi}{\partial N} = \frac{\partial g(N)}{\partial N} - \frac{L}{p} - M    .$$
$$\frac{\partial^{2} \pi}{\partial N^{2} } = \frac{\partial^{2} g(N) }{ \partial N^{2 }}   .$$

The condition for the maximum of the profit is $\frac{\partial \pi}{\partial N} = 0$, and so we have

$$\frac{\partial g(N) }{\partial N} = \frac{L}{p} + M   .$$

Thus differentiating its both sides with regard to R gives us

$$\frac{\partial^{2} g(N) }{\partial N^{2} }  \frac{ \partial N}{\partial R} = - \frac{L }{p}  \frac{\partial p}{\partial R}  .$$

It turns out that $\frac{\partial N}{\partial R}$ is negative, which means that the more difficult to sack a shirker the lower employment level.

== Trade liberalization ==
Davis and Harrigan consider the effects of trade liberalization on firms and workers, merging the variant of the Shapiro-Stiglitz model of efficiency wages and the Melitz model.

A CES utility function and an aggregate price are represented by $V = [\int q(i)^{\rho} di]^{1/\rho}, P=[\int p(i)^{1-\sigma} di]^{1/(1-\sigma)}$ respectively, where $q(i)$ is the demand for product i. Elasticity of substitution is $\sigma=1/(1-\rho)$, where $0<\rho<1$. Then we have the revenue for the producer $r(i)=R(p(i)/P)^{1-\sigma}$, and the demand is $q(i)=Q(p(i)/P)^{-\sigma}$. The price is given by $p(i)=r(i)/q(i)$. We also have the price rule $p(i)=W_{i}/(\rho \phi_{i})$, where $W_{i}$ and $\phi_{i}$ are the nominal wage and productivity, respectively of firm i.

Here productivity and firm-specific wage are seen as performance indicators of a firm, and the inverse marginal cost $z_{i}=\phi_{i}/W_{i}$ for company i is introduced to reflect them.

Zero cutoff productivity (ZCP) condition $r(z^{*})/ \sigma-f=0$ and Free Entry (FE) condition $\tilde{\pi}(z^{*})=\frac{\delta f_{e}}{1 - G(z^{*}) }$ allow us to determine the equilibrium marginal entrant $z^{*}$, where $G(z )=Pr[Z\leq z]$ is the cumulative distribution function.

Then the equilibrium point is used for providing the average wage distortion:

$$(W/m)^{*} = \frac{\delta f_{e}}{1 - G(z^{*}) } + f + \int \frac{q(i) W(i) }{\phi(i) m(i) } \psi(i | z^{*} ) di ,$$

where $\psi(i | z^{*} )$ is the density of active firms, and $f_{e}$ is fixed entry cost. $\delta$ is firm death rate, and a firm type is identified by $i=(\phi, W)$.

With the monitoring ability $\bar{m}$ of the firm most proficient at monitoring, the equilibrium unemployment rate is determined by

$$u = \frac{  A_{1} (W/m )^{*} }{1 + A_{1}(W/m)^{*} } ,$$

where $A_{1}= \delta(e-1) / (e \bar{m} )$. Also, the equilibrium mass of firms is determined by

$$(1 -u)L  = M [  \frac{\delta f_{e}}{1 - G(z^{*}) } + f + \int \frac{q(i) }{\phi(i)  } \psi(i | z^{*} ) di ] .$$

They consider Regions I to IV in the $\phi_{i}W_{i}$-plane according to marginal costs. Suppose firms paying the highest level of marginal cost in autarky are on the line $W_{i}=(1/z_{a}^{*} ) \phi_{i }$, and the marginal entrant in freer trade is on the line $W_{i}=(1/z) \phi_{i}$. The marginal exporter and firms making minimum profits in freer trade are on $W_{i}=(1/z_{x})\phi_{i }$ and $W_{i}=(1/z_{\pi} )\phi_{i }$, respectively. Thus, these regions are given by:

$$\begin{cases}
W_{i}>(1/z^{*}) \phi_{i} \cap W_{i} < (1/z_{a}^{*}) \phi_{i}  & \rightarrow \text{Region I}
\\
W_{i}>(1/z_{x}) \phi_{i} \cap W_{i} < (1/z^{*}) \phi_{i}  & \rightarrow \text{Region II}
\\
W_{i}>(1/z_{\pi}) \phi_{i} \cap W_{i} < (1/z_{x}) \phi_{i} & \rightarrow \text{Region III}
\\
W_{i} < (1/z_{\pi}) \phi_{i} & \rightarrow \text{Region IV}
\end{cases}$$

The big companies increase their profits in Region IV in freer trade, while firms in Region II and III decrease profits. All firms in Region I exit in freer trade, and therefore their profits and output plunge to zero. Suppose $\bar{W_{a} }$ is the average wage in autarky. Then a good job in autarky is defined as one that pays a wage $W_{a}$ such that $W_{a}>\bar{W_{a} }$. For a specific productivity, the highest paying jobs in autarky are in Region I, and they are lost in freer trade. The second highest paying jobs are in Region II, and some of them are lost in freer trade. The lowest paying jobs are in Region IV, and they expand in freer trade.

Davis and Harrigan carry out numerical simulations and find that a trade liberalization destroys up to 25 percent of good jobs.

== See also ==
- Involuntary unemployment
- Nominal rigidity
- Reserve army of labour
- Efficiency wage
