= Scottish Unemployed Workers Network =

Scottish political organisation

- Abbreviation: SUWN
- Region served: Scotland
- Website: scottishunemployedworkers.net

The Scottish Unemployed Workers Network (SUWN) is a left-leaning political organisation in Scotland which advocates on behalf of unemployed working-class people. It aims to be "a source of advice and information" as well as a vehicle for campaigning and organisation.

The organisation is based principally in Dundee and campaigns heavily on the issues of welfare sanctions and poverty. The organisation has highlighted the struggle of many people to find jobs and the challenges in living on benefits. In December 2014, the organisation published a detailed report claiming that Scottish welfare claimants are being hit by excessive and arbitrary sanctions as a result of UK Government welfare reforms.

== See also ==
- Scottish Socialist Party
