= Practice firm =

Type of practice firm for business students

A Practice Enterprise (PE, also known as a Practice Firm or Virtual Enterprise) is a business simulation company used by people in commercial training or at business schools that operates with business procedures, products, and services like a real enterprise. A PE resembles a real company in its form, organization, and function.

Each PE trades with others, following standard commercial business procedures in the PE economic environment. It offers a ‘learning-by-doing’ training programme aimed at better preparing young people for their future careers and increasing their entrepreneurship potential through running their own PE.

== History ==
The origins of the PE concept run back to the late 19th Century. Letter exchange clubs were formed in Europe as a way of training commercial communication. The letter exchange clubs became more and more popular and turned into the first practice bureaus around 1920 and were used in a number of countries across Europe.

The first structure for the practice bureaus was the “German Practice Economy” in 1934, and in 1948, the first central office for PEs was established by the German Trade Unions. Thereby, a real practice firm market was formed offering several things, including a database to connect, bank services resembling real bank systems, mail exchanges, and trades with other countries, such as Austria, Sweden and Switzerland. In the 1960s, the first central office organising the services provided to the network was formed in the city of Heidelberg in Germany, and the first fair for Practice Firms was held in a gymnastic hall in Northern Germany in 1964.

In 1993, a European project was funded by the European Social Fund and the German Federal State of North Rhine-Westphalia to connect the different networks around the world to an international association. The European project established the non-profit association EUROPEN, which at that time was a department of the Bfz-Essen e.V. in Germany. As the association grew internationally and became an independent entity in 1997, it adjusted its name in 2005 to EUROPEN-PEN International, emphasising the members from across the world. Since 2021, the international association has updated its name from EUROPEN-PEN International to PEN Worldwide.

== Concept, Methodology and Skills ==
The PE concept is applied in different educational systems: from schools, colleges, universities, vocational training institutions^{3}, companies and further training centres worldwide. The primary target group is students from secondary schools and universities. Adults can also participate in the training programme, either as employees, jobseekers, and people with disabilities or women returning to work.

This applied way of learning, the ‘learning-by-doing’^{4} methodology, allows people to improve their skills in a PE. Trainees get to know the real-life international business experience and learn and improve important skills such as language and communication skills, intercultural competences and various soft skills which can help increase their chance of employment.

Trainees learn many different entrepreneurship skills^{5} such as Administration skills, Accountancy, Computer-based skills (ICT), Human resources management, Marketing and Sales, Purchasing, Business planning, International trade, and Time management. In addition, they also develop the necessary competences to become a better employee or entrepreneur, such as teamwork, problem-solving, taking responsibility and developing self-initiative. Because of the international nature of the programme, trainees also learn about intercultural differences when doing business and additionally they have the opportunity to increase their language skills. The skills and competences gained in a PE can easily be transferred and adjusted to other markets, countries and potential work fields.

=== Training Environment and Activities ===
Generally, a PE has the same key players and benefits wherever it is located. The trainees are the employees of the PE and run the business themselves, whereas the teacher or trainer takes on the role of a mentor or coach.

The setting of a PE provides a way for trainees to learn practically through the ‘learning-by-doing’ methodology and also to get into the entrepreneurial mindset. The PE programme design enables trainees to take responsibility for operating a virtual company and for the sale of products (for example, pharmaceuticals, books, food, machinery) and services (for example, shipping, warehousing, events, travel, catering services) and for the revenues and expenditures of their company. Each company engages in business activities, both nationally and internationally, with other companies within the PE network (for example, between Brazil and Spain), by following standard commercial business procedures and frameworks.

Each company carries out market research, places advertisements, buys raw materials and stock, plans logistics, manufactures simulated goods, sells simulated goods or services, and pays wages, taxes, benefits, etc. The actual transfer of goods and money happens virtually, but the following transactions take place for real: orders are made, invoices issued, and financial records maintained, including information about creditors, debtors, stockholders, etc.

All trainers involved in the PE programme are trained in workplace facilitation. Trainers receive guidelines and practical handbooks to run the programme and to assess the trainees based on the same set of criteria. Trainers in a PE take on the role of a coach or mentor for trainees, instead of the traditional teacher role.

Most PEs have a mentor company that comes from the real business world. A business mentor gives advice and ideas to the trainers and trainees about how a business is run and can advise on the sale of products and services within the virtual business. In some cases, business mentors are involved in the selection and recruitment of staff (e.g. students within the school or university).

There are standard requirements regarding equipment and IT (hardware and software) that need to be met for running the programme. To make the experience as realistic as possible, each classroom is divided into different sections that represent the different departments of a business such as reception, purchasing, human resources, operations and marketing.

PE fairs exist nationally and internationally. They provide a platform for students to experience and test skills in classrooms or offices by enabling them to represent their business to other PEs in person, to learn professional representation in front of competitors, and follow up after trades on the fairground. During these fairs, several competitions take place, varying from ‘Best Booth’ to other business challenges, like elevator pitches and case studies.

== See also ==
- Business simulation
- Vocational education
- Adult education
- Education
- Training
