= Christopher Ruhm =

American economist, academic and author

Christopher J. Ruhm
- Born: United States
- Occupations: Economist, academic and author

Academic background
- Education: B.A. M.A. PhD
- Alma mater: University of California, Davis; University of California, Berkeley

Christopher J. Ruhm is an American economist, academic and author. He is a professor of public policy and economics at the University of Virginia and is a professor emeritus at the University of North Carolina at Greensboro.

Ruhm is most known for his works on the relationship between macroeconomic conditions and health as well as issues related to work-family balance, particularly the effects of parental and family leave policies. His research has been published in leading academic journals, including the American Economic Review, Quarterly Journal of Economics, Journal of Health Economics and Handbook of Health Economics.

Ruhm is a research associate at the National Bureau of Economic Research, and a research fellow at the Institute of Labor Economics.

== Education ==
Ruhm earned his B.A. from the University of California, Davis, in 1978. Following that, he completed his M.A. in 1981 and PhD in 1984 from the University of California, Berkeley.

== Career ==
Ruhm joined Boston University as assistant professor from 1984 to 1991. In 1991, he became part of the faculty at the University of North Carolina, Greensboro, where he served as associate professor of economics from 1991 to 1994, professor of economics from 1994 to 1997, and Jefferson-Pilot Excellence Professor of Economics from 1997 to 2010. He has held the title of professor emeritus in the Department of Economics at the University of North Carolina, Greensboro since 2011. Moreover, he has been a professor of public policy and economics at the University of Virginia since 2011, where he also served as associate dean for academic affairs at the Frank Batten School of Leadership and Public Policy from 2013 to 2015.

From 1996 to 1997, Ruhm was a Senior Economist on President Clinton's Council of Economic Advisers, where his main responsibilities were in the areas of health policy and aging. At the Southern Economic Association, he served on the board of trustees from 2004 to 2008, vice president from 2009 to 2011, and president elect, president, and past president from 2016 to 2021.

Since 1994, Ruhm has served as a research associate at the National Bureau of Economic Research. Moreover, since 2002 he has held the position of a research fellow at the Institute for the Study of Labor.

== Media coverage ==
Ruhm's work has been cited in media and news outlets, including Wall Street Journal, The Economist, and The New York Times. He also appeared in an interview on National Public Radio, where he proposed a reevaluation of the societal emphasis on work. He suggested that an excessive focus on employment may have adverse health effects, emphasizing that economic contractions, while resulting in multiple negative consequences, also reduce most types of mortality rates.

== Research ==
Ruhm's research has focused on the impact of parental leave policies, mandated employment benefits, job displacements, retirement transitions, and a broad range of topics in health economics and policy.

Ruhm showed that retirements of U.S. workers frequently occurred gradually and often involved periods in bridge jobs. Analyzing parental leave mandates in nine European countries over the 1969 to 1993 period, his 1998 study revealed that while paid leave boosted female employment, if too lengthy, they resulted in reductions in women's relative wages. In later work, he focused on paid and unpaid parental leave in the United States, with most of that research examining state-level mandates, since there is no paid leave entitlement at the federal level.

On the same subject, Ruhm co-authored the book titled Time Off With Baby: The Case for Paid Care Leave, in which he advocated for the implementation of paid care leave in the United States. The book presented a case based on its positive impact on babies, families, and society. Additionally, it offered an analysis of international examples and proposed a national leave policy. While reviewing the book, Kathleen McCarthey, said "In this important volume, Ed Zigler, Susan Muenchow and Christopher Ruhm make the strong case that U.S. family policies have not kept pace with the 'profound social transitions' accompanying the dramatic increases in maternal employment. Because the first years of life provide a foundation for healthy development – social, emotional, cognitive, linguistic, and physical – it is critical that we build public will to support young children and their families, as most European countries do." She further suggested that the United States is an outlier in its approach to family policies compared to other nations, prompting readers to question whether this decision aligns with principles of social justice, education, health, or economic perspectives. In later work Ruhm refined his proposals for a national paid leave policy. Additionally, from 2017 to 2020, he was a member of the AEI-Brookings Working Group on Paid Family and Medical Leave, which explored bipartisan approaches to providing these leaves.

Ruhm has also studied the role of policies related to early childhood care and education. In his exploration of the influence of preschool participation on school readiness, his collaborative work with Katherine A. Magnuson and others revealed that children, especially those in disadvantaged groups, attending such programs exhibit enhanced early reading and math skills, emphasizing the potential for policies promoting preschool enrollment to address readiness disparities. In related research, he examined the impact of prekindergarten programs on school readiness, indicating that although they enhance reading and math skills at entry, they also result in increased behavior problems, particularly for disadvantaged children, persisting into first grade; however, public school-based pre kindergartens showed no adverse behavioral effects.

In his health economics research, Ruhm's 2000 study indicated that most types of mortality, with the exception of suicides, decline when the economy weakens, with potential roles for reductions in driving, obesity, and smoking. Later, in related analysis, he examined the patterns for non-fatal health conditions. He further studied the roles of risky behaviors, such as smoking, obesity, drinking, and physical activity, and investigated to what extent these patterns have changed over time. He has also explored other risky behaviors. He has studied the economic causes and consequences of rising obesity, including the inter-relationship of biological and economic factors, as well as the potential for government policies to address the problem. Moreover, he stressed the need for comprehensive interventions targeting factors like information gaps, addictive behavior, and the obesogenic environment. In a related vein, he has developed methods to forecast the future prevalence of obesity and severe obesity. With John Cawley, he co-authored a chapter on the economics of risky behaviors in the Handbook of Health Economics.

Ruhm's more recent health-related work has centered on two areas. First, he has studied the measurement and causes of the fatal drug epidemic in the U.S., developing methods to better determine the types of drugs involved in deadly overdoses, that correct for incomplete reporting on death certificates, as well as providing evidence that supply-side factors are the primary cause of increased drug deaths during the 21st century. He has also been active in efforts to offer an equitable approach for distributing opioid abatement settlement funds among localities in Virginia, Texas and other states. and in examining whether federal opioid grant funding is targeted to the states with the greatest need. Secondly, he assessed the impact of COVID-19 on excess mortality, quantifying the number and distribution of these deaths during the first and second years of the pandemic. He emphasized disparities in these deaths related to age, race/ethnicity, and cause.

== Awards and honors ==
- 2003 – Senior Faculty Research Excellence Award, University of North Carolina at Greensboro
- 2017 & 2020 – Faculty Excellence Awards for Public Engagement, University of Virginia
- 2018 – Faculty Excellence Award for University and Professional Service, University of Virginia
- 2019 – Faculty Excellence Award for Research, University of Virginia
- 2023 – Top 2% of Economists in the World, RePEc
- 2023 – Top 20 Health Economists in the World, RePEc
- 2023 – Distinguished fellow at Southern Economic Association

== Bibliography ==
=== Books ===
- Zigler, Edward; Muenchow, Susan; Ruhm, Christopher J. (2012). Time Off with Baby: The Case for Paid Care Leave. Zero to Three. ISBN 978-1-934019-97-9.

=== Selected articles ===
- Ruhm, Christopher J. (1998). "The Economic Consequences of Parental Leave Mandates: Lessons from Europe" (PDF). The Quarterly Journal of Economics. 113 (1): 285–317. doi:10.1162/003355398555586. JSTOR 2586992. S2CID 263406257.
- Ruhm, C. J. (May 2000). "Are Recessions Good for Your Health?" (PDF). The Quarterly Journal of Economics. 115 (2): 617–650. doi:10.1162/003355300554872.
- Magnuson, Katherine A.; Meyers, Marcia K.; Ruhm, Christopher J.; Waldfogel, Jane (January 2004). "Inequality in Preschool Education and School Readiness". American Educational Research Journal. 41 (1): 115–157. doi:10.3102/00028312041001115. S2CID 53704500.
- Finkelstein, Eric A.; Ruhm, Christopher J.; Kosa, Katherine M. (21 April 2005). "Economic causes and consequences of obesity". Annual Review of Public Health. 26 (1): 239–257. doi:10.1146/annurev.publhealth.26.021304.144628. PMID 15760288.
- Magnuson, Katherine A.; Ruhm, Christopher; Waldfogel, Jane (February 2007). "Does prekindergarten improve school preparation and performance?" (PDF). Economics of Education Review. 26 (1): 33–51. doi:10.1016/j.econedurev.2005.09.008.
