= Impossible Is Nothing (video résumé) =

Internet meme

Video frame of a ballroom dancing scene

Impossible Is Nothing is a 2006 video résumé by Aleksey Vayner (born Aleksey Garber, 1983 or 1984 – January 23, 2013), a student at Yale University. It became an Internet meme after circulating widely online.

== History of the video ==
In October 2006, Yale University student Aleksey Vayner applied for a job with UBS, an investment bank. A UBS employee shared the application materials with colleagues, reportedly due to its exaggerated self-presentation. The video was posted on various blogs, then YouTube, where it became an immense viral Internet phenomenon.

== Video description ==
The video opens with Vayner giving a lengthy response to a question from an offscreen voice. Using a considerable amount of business jargon, Vayner praises himself and shares his various insights on success, talent, and overcoming adversity. Interspliced with the interview are clips of various feats purportedly performed by Vayner, including bench pressing, skiing, playing tennis, ballroom dancing, and karate-chopping a stack of bricks. The video ends with a dedication to Radomir Kovačević and a credits sequence.

=== Features ===
Vayner's job application includes:

- Cover letter
- Resume: one and a half pages
- Writing sample: eight pages
- A glamour shot of Vayner
- Seven-minute video that features the following alleged feats by Vayner:
  - Interview: gives advice for achieving life goals
  - Bench press: 495 pounds (225 kilograms)
  - Downhill skiing with jumps
  - Tennis serve: 140 miles per hour (225 km/h or 63 m/s)
  - Ballroom dancing with a female dancer
  - Karate chop: seven bricks broken

=== Dispute with IvyGate ===
One blog, IvyGate, became famous due to its disputes with Vayner. When Vayner emailed a cease-and-desist letter demanding that IvyGate remove "Impossible is Nothing" links from its website, the blog instead published the threat and taunted Vayner to sue them. In further investigating the incident, IvyGate learned and published that:

- Youth Empowerment Strategies, a charity Vayner said he started, claimed a "four star" rating by Charity Navigator on its website, when in fact the charity did not exist (other than an organization by the same name unrelated to Vayner) and did not receive the rating. According to The New York Times, Vayner defended himself by saying that "he had outsourced the design of his charity's website to companies in India and Pakistan and had no role in placing the Charity Navigator banner on it. Vayner told a reporter that he had the banner taken down immediately when he learned that the group had disclaimed the banner, some time around 15 September. When a reporter then told Vayner that the banner was still on the site as of the preceding week, Vayner clarified that he had sent notification to take down the banner." Trent Stamp, the president of Charity Navigator, has stated that he believes Vayner should be expelled from Yale for this.
- Vayner Capital Management LLC, a hedge fund Vayner says he started, had a complete website describing its personnel and investment strategies. The firm did not exist and the website content was plagiarized from a firm in Denver, Colorado.
- Women's Silent Tears, a book Vayner self-published on the Holocaust, contained passages lifted verbatim from various Internet sites. Vayner claimed that the text was a "pre-publication copy".

=== Controversies and disputed claims ===
Other investigating publications learned that Vayner had variously claimed the following:

- He won two games against tennis great Pete Sampras, and taught Jerry Seinfeld and Harrison Ford to play
- He is an expert in Chinese orthopedic massage
- The Dalai Lama wrote his college recommendation letter
- He was an action stuntman and professional skier
- He is a professional model and has appeared in promotional ads for multiple clothing stores including Ann Taylor and Saks Fifth Avenue
- He worked for the Central Intelligence Agency
- He is a master in the art of Tibetan bone-setting
- He forged passports for the Russian mafia
- He participated in Tibetan gladiatorial contests
- He is one of four people in the state of Connecticut certified to handle nuclear waste
- He was the original developer of Napster

Rumpus Magazine, a Yale University tabloid, had already exposed Vayner as a possible fake before attending Yale.

=== Aftermath and development of meme ===
The Internet meme surrounding "Impossible Is Nothing" spread in typical fashion: by word of mouth on blogs and by Internet, then covered both as a meme and a human interest story by major newspapers, which further accelerated growth. After the first phase of popularity, blog posters and others began adding their own fanciful contributions to Vayner's legend. These include several classic meme features:

- Hyperbolic statements of accomplishment: Vayner is licensed to handle nuclear waste, must register his hands as lethal weapons, and participates in Tibetan gladiatorial contests.
- Actor Michael Cera created a parody video, "Impossible is the Opposite of Possible".
- The US sitcom How I Met Your Mother featured an episode entitled "The Possimpible" in which a main character has a video resume that is a clear parody of "Impossible Is Nothing."

Vayner did not receive a job offer from UBS or any other bank, so he took a leave of absence from Yale.

== Subsequent work ==
In January 2008, Vayner set up a website promoting his book, Millionaires' Blueprint to Success.

Cracked.com, an Internet humor site, pointed out that his book is extremely similar in layout and content to a book titled Secrets of the Millionaire Mind by T. Harv Eker in their article "Where Are They Now: Six "Stars" From Embarrassing Viral Videos," about the aftermath of several viral videos.

Vayner appeared in Winnebago Man, a 2009 documentary about Jack Rebney, whose profanity-laced outtakes from a Winnebago industrial film also became an Internet meme.

== Death ==
On 23 January 2013, the Ivy League blog IvyGate reported, and Gawker.com later confirmed, that Vayner had died of unknown causes. A relative later said he had been told that the 29-year-old Vayner apparently had a heart attack after taking medicine of some kind.
