= Screening (economics) =

Strategy of combating adverse selection

Screening in economics refers to a strategy of combating adverse selection – one of the potential decision-making complications in cases of asymmetric information – by the agent(s) with less information.

For the purposes of screening, asymmetric information cases assume two economic agents, with agents attempting to engage in some sort of transaction. There often exists a long-term relationship between the two agents, though that qualifier is not necessary. Fundamentally, the strategy involved with screening comprises the “screener” (the agent with less information) attempting to gain further insight or knowledge into private information that the other economic agent possesses which is initially unknown to the screener before the transaction takes place. In gathering such information, the information asymmetry between the two agents is reduced, meaning that the screening agent can then make more informed decisions when partaking in the transaction. Industries that utilise screening are able to filter out useful information from false information in order to get a clearer picture of the informed party. This is important when addressing problems such as adverse selection and moral hazard. Moreover, screening allows for efficiency as it enhances the flow of information between agents as typically asymmetric information causes inefficiency.

Screening is applied in a number of industries and markets. The exact type of information intended to be revealed by the screener ranges widely; the actual screening process implemented depends on the nature of the transaction taking place. Often it is closely connected with the future relationship between the two agents. Both economic agents can benefit through the notion of screening, for example in job markets, when employers screen future employees through the job interview, they are able to identify the areas the employee needs further training on. This benefits both parties as it allows for the employer to maximise from employing the individual and the individual benefits from furthering their skill set.

The concept of screening was first developed by Michael Spence (1973). It should be distinguished from signalling – a strategy of combating adverse selection undertaken by the agent(s) with more information.

== Examples ==
=== Labour market ===
Screening techniques are employed within the labour market during the hiring and recruitment stage of a job application process. In brief, the hiring party (agent with less information) attempts to reveal more about the characteristics of potential job candidates (agents with more information) so as to make the most optimal choice in recruiting a worker for the role.

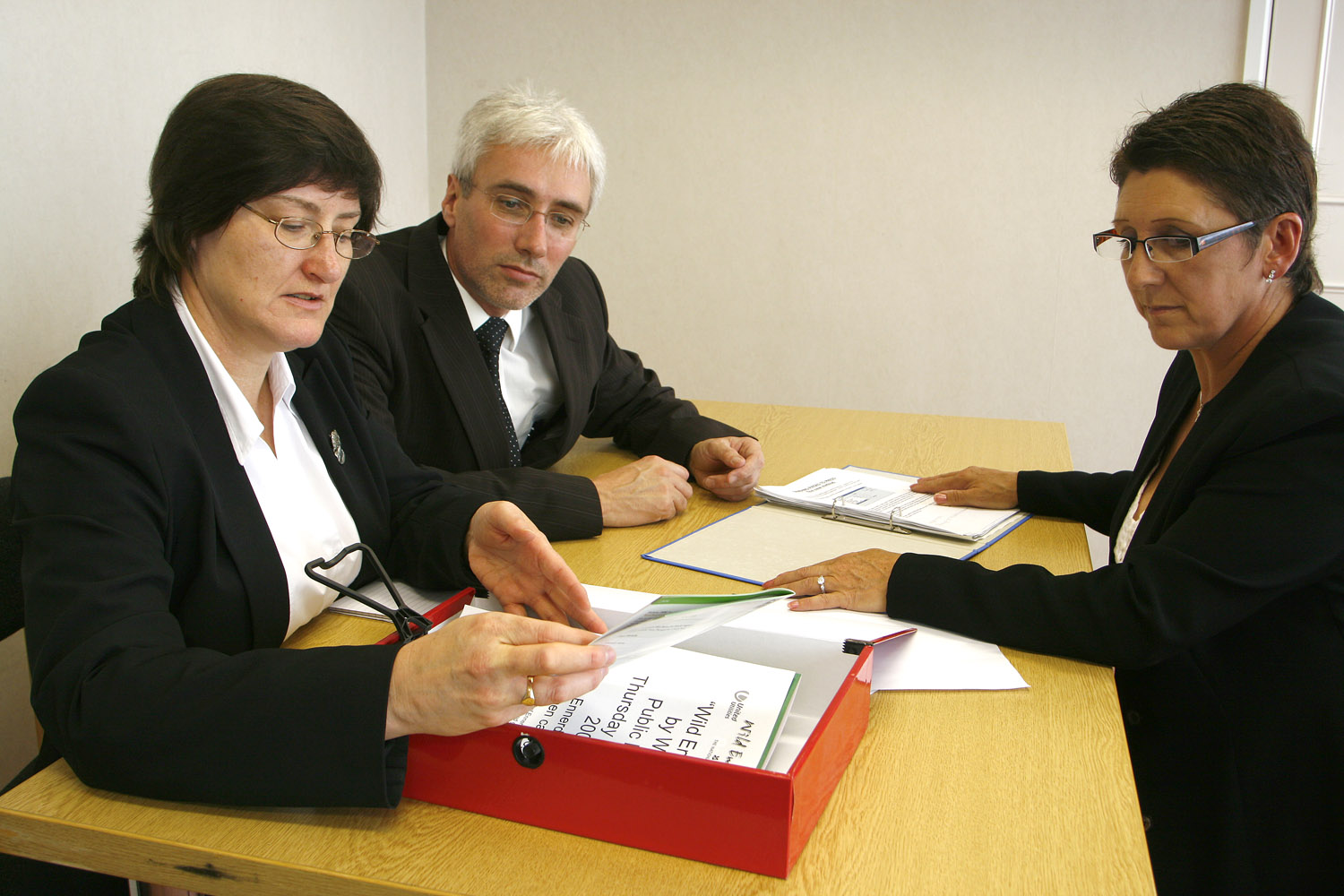
Interviews are a key screening technique used by hiring parties in a job recruitment process.

Screening techniques include:

- Application review – the hiring party initially screens applicants by undertaking a review of their application submission and any responses received, including an evaluation of their resume and cover letter to reveal education, experience and fit for the role
- Aptitude testing and assessment – the hiring party may require applicants to undertake a range of testing exercises (either online or in-person) to reveal academic or practical abilities
- Interviews – candidates are often required to undertake an interview with a representative(s) from the hiring party to reveal a range of factors such as personality traits, verbal communication ability and confidence level

=== Insurance market ===
The process of screening customers is highly applicable in the market for insurance. In general, parties providing insurance perform such activities to reveal the overall risk level of a customer, and as such, the likelihood that they will file for a claim. When in possession of this information, the insuring party can ensure a suitable form of cover (i.e. commensurate with the customer’s risk level) is provided.

In particular, Michael Rothschild and Joseph Stiglitz conducted research on the insurance market and how individuals can improve their position in the market when presented with asymmetric information. Rothschild and Stiglitz found that individuals (uninformed party) are able to initiate action by extracting information through screening in order to better position themselves in the market. Insurance companies (uninformed party) had lacked information on the risk level of consumers (informed party). Through screening, insurance companies were able to gain information on the risk level of their consumers, this had been done by offering incentives to policyholders in order to disclose such information on customers. This allowed insurance companies to create a range of risk classes in which their consumers were allocated. Moreover, this allowed insurance companies to create policy contracts for higher deductibles in exchange for lower premiums.

Screening techniques include:

- Background check – the party providing insurance obtains information about the customer such as their criminal history, credit rating and previous employment to reveal past behaviors
- Provision of demographic information – the party providing insurance obtains information about the customer such as their age, gender and ethnicity to reveal their type. For example, a young male has a higher risk of being in a car accident than a middle-aged woman

Other information gathered by insurance parties during a screening process is usually specific to the type of insurance the customer is seeking. For example, car insurance will require provision of accident history, health insurance will require provision of health condition and previous illnesses, and so on.

Moral hazard:

Moral hazard take place when one party engages in actions that harm the other party. The chance of moral hazard can occur especially in insurance companies, in which one party takes part in risky behaviour as they have insurance coverage and therefore will benefit from being compensated by the insurance company. In this case, the insurance company is the uninformed party, however, through screening processes such as historic behaviour, therefore, insurance companies are able to identify those individuals in order to offer a different insurance plan.

=== Product market ===
Businesses apply screening techniques when generating and adapting a new product idea. Once businesses have developed product ideas, screening processes are used in order to determine how well the product will do in the market. In this scenario, businesses are the uninformed party whilst consumers are the informed party, however, in order to understand what consumers are looking for in products, businesses deploy screening techniques to get a detailed idea.

Screening techniques include:

- Research and development - businesses take feedback from consumers based on prior products or products similar to one currently being developed to find what areas to improve on as well as how to create a point of difference to establish an innovative product that yields high return. Moreover, this allows businesses to identify consumer needs, the profitability of the idea and where the product fits in the market.
- Test marketing - the party providing the product obtains information from a group of individuals that represent the product market in order to understand how well the product will do in the market as well as how much individuals value the product. This screening process allows businesses to further understand how to market the product to appeal to individuals as well as gain information on the product market.
- Product launch - product launching is a screening process as it allows businesses to gain further information on how the product will do in the market as the product launch stage is the beginning of the product life cycle. Moreover, based on how the product does in the market as well as the feedback provided by consumers, businesses are able to gain further information on what areas of the product need to be improved.

=== Other techniques ===
Second-degree price discrimination is also an example of screening, whereby a seller offers a menu of options and the buyer's choice reveals their private information. Specifically, such a strategy attempts to reveal more information about a buyer’s willingness to pay. For example, an airline offering economy, premium economy, business and first class tickets reveals information regarding the amount the customer is willing to spend on their airfare. With such information, firms can capture a greater portion of total market surplus.

== Incorrect Screening ==
One downfall of deploying screening techniques is the information gathered may be incorrect, this can therefore lead to inefficiency. For example, an unproductive employee may perform well in screening exams such as aptitude testing. However, as the employer is the uninformed party, they will not be able to notice these aspects until the individual has been employed, and therefore, the time and effort put into the employee causes inefficiency. Hence, it is important for industries to understand the biases involved when utilising screening techniques.

=== Incorrect Screening in the Insurance Market ===
Typical screening processes in the insurance market involve looking at historic data and demographic information, however, these screening processes may lead to incorrect conclusions. For example, a young male would typically be seen as high risk however, this may not truly be reflected as they could be a safe driver. Therefore, insurance companies need to ensure that further information is gathered prior to concluding what category individuals suit.

== Contract theory ==
In contract theory, the terms "screening models" and "adverse selection models" are often used interchangeably. An agent has private information about his type (e.g., his costs or his valuation of a good) before the principal makes a contract offer. The principal will then offer a menu of contracts in order to separate the different types. Typically, the best type will trade the same amount as in the first-best benchmark solution (which would be attained under complete information), a property known as "no distortion at the top". All other types typically trade less than in the first-best solution (i.e., there is a "downward distortion" of the trade level).

Optimal auction design (more generally known as Bayesian mechanism design) can be seen as a multi-agent version of the basic screening model. Contract-theoretic screening models have been pioneered by Roger Myerson and Eric Maskin. They have been extended in various directions. For example, it has been shown that, in the context of patent licensing, optimal screening contracts may actually yield too much trade compared to the first-best solution. Applications of screening models include regulation, public procurement, and monopolistic price discrimination. Contract-theoretic screening models have been successfully tested in laboratory experiments and using field data.

== See also ==
- Adverse selection
- Information asymmetry
- Joseph E. Stiglitz
