= Literacy Center West =

Literacy Center West is a nonprofit organization located in Cincinnati, Ohio’s East Price Hill neighborhood. The center provides GED preparation and job-readiness training to low-income individuals. The overall mission of the center is "to develop a community in which citizens improve their lives through education and economic opportunity."

== History ==
Founded in 1988 as Nativity Literacy Center, the organization changed its name to Literacy Center West in 2002 and switched focus from basic literacy instruction to GED preparation and job placement services.

Literacy Center West also provides contracted GED preparation services for the Hamilton County Adult Probation Department and the Camp Washington Neighborhood Center.

== Activities ==
=== GED Preparation ===
For students 17 and older, the program combines classroom, small group and one-on-one instruction to prepare students to take the Ohio GED test. The program also includes Armed Services Vocational Aptitude Battery, ASVAB, preparation and tutoring for in-school youth.

=== Job Placement ===
"The Next Level" program provides career exploration, job search training, resume and cover letter development, job application training, interviewing skills instruction, job placement, job retention counseling and intensive case management for economically disadvantaged young men and women between the ages of 18 and 21.
