= Zety =

Online career technology platform

- Type: Subsidiary
- Industry: Career development, HR software
- Predecessor: InterviewMe.pl
- Founded: May 2014; 12 years ago
- Founders: Kuba Koziej, Pete Sosnowski, Kacper Brzozowski
- Area served: Worldwide
- Products: Résumé builder, cover letter generator, career resources
- Parent: BOLD LLC (2019–present)
- Website: zety.com

Zety is an online career technology platform that develops résumé-building and cover-letter software and publishes job-search and career guides. It was founded in Poland in May 2014 by Kuba Koziej, Pete Sosnowski, and Kacper Brzozowski under the name InterviewMe.pl, and launched an English-language platform, Uptowork.com, in June 2016 that was renamed Zety in July 2018. Since January 2019 it has been owned by the American career-services company BOLD LLC.

The career technology service provides résumé and job-application tools localized for several markets, including the United States, the United Kingdom, France, Germany, Italy, Spain, and Brazil.

== History ==
In May 2014, InterviewMe.pl was launched in Poland by Kuba Koziej, Pete Sosnowski, and Kacper Brzozowski as an online service offering résumé-building tools and career resources.

In June 2016, the company launched Uptowork.com, an English-language platform that was rebranded as Zety in July 2018.

In January 2019, Zety was acquired by BOLD. By November 2023, the company reported that its team had grown to more than 200 employees.

== Activities ==
Zety provides online tools for creating résumés and cover letters, including customizable templates and application-related resources. The company also publishes career guidance content covering topics such as job searching, interviewing, networking, and professional development.

Career surveys and advice published by Zety have been cited by news outlets including Business Insider, CNBC, and Forbes in articles related to careers, recruitment, and workplace trends.
