= Jobless recovery =

Economic phenomenon

A jobless recovery or jobless growth is an economic phenomenon in which a macroeconomy experiences growth while maintaining or decreasing its level of employment. The term was coined by the economist Nick Perna in the early 1990s.

== Causes ==
Some argue that a jobless recovery is caused by increased productivity through automation, which allows economic growth without reducing unemployment or enabling economies to provide universal basic income. However, critics view this as an example of the luddite fallacy, suggesting instead that jobless recoveries result from structural changes in the labor market. These changes lead to unemployment as workers require new skills, but the education system has not adapted to provide relevant knowledge and competencies. Other economists attribute jobless recoveries to broader macroeconomic misalignments between endogenous growth, labor absorption capacity, and the distribution of income and wealth.

=== Industrial consolidation ===
Some have argued that the recent lack of job creation in the United States is due to increased industrial consolidation and growth of monopoly or oligopoly power. The argument is twofold: firstly, small businesses create most American jobs, and secondly, small businesses have more difficulty starting and growing in the face of entrenched existing businesses (compare infant industry argument, applied at the level of industries, rather than individual firms).

== Population growth vs. employment growth ==
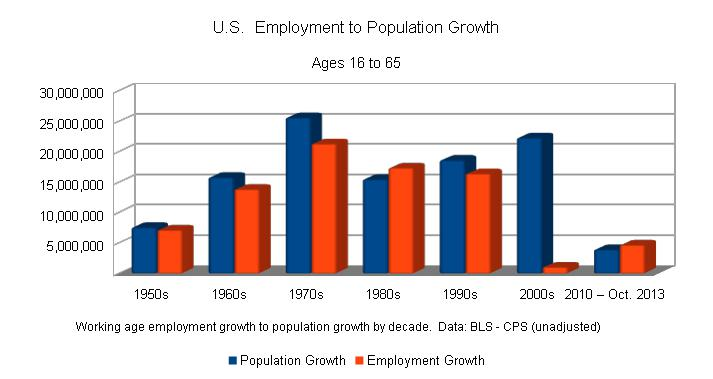

In addition to employment growth, population growth must also be considered concerning the perception of jobless recoveries. Immigrants (both legal and illegal) added to the workforce will often accept lower wages, causing persistent unemployment among those who were previously employed.

Surprisingly, the U.S. Bureau of Labor Statistics (BLS) does not offer data-sets isolated to the working-age population (ages 16 to 65). Including retirement age individuals in most BLS data-sets may tend to obfuscate the analysis of employment creation in relation to population growth. Additionally, incorrect assumptions about the term, Labor force, might also occur when reading BLS publications, millions of employable persons are not included within the official definition. The Labor force, as defined by the BLS, is a strict definition of those officially unemployed (U-3), and those who are officially employed (1 hour or more).

Once again, the baby-boom generation has become a generator of change, this time in its retirement. Moreover, the jobless recovery of the 2001 recession, coupled with the severe economic impact of the 2007–2009 recession, caused disruptions in the labor market. In the first 12 years of the 21st century, the growth of the population has slowed and labor force participation rates generally have declined. As a result, labor force growth also has slowed. The Bureau of Labor Statistics (BLS) projects that the next 10 years will bring about an aging labor force that is growing slowly, a declining overall labor force participation rate, and more diversity in the racial and ethnic composition of the labor force.

— Bureau of Labor Statistics, Monthly Labor Review, December 2013.

The following table and included chart depicts year-to-year employment growth in comparison to population growth for those persons under 65 years of age. As such, baby boomer retirements are removed from the data as a factor for consideration. The table includes the Bureau of Labor Statistics, Current Population Survey, for the Civilian noninstitutional population and corresponding Employment Levels, dating from 1948 and includes October 2013, the age groups are 16 years & over, and 65 years & over. The working-age population is then determined by subtracting those age 65 and over from the Civilian noninstitutional population and Employment Levels respectively. Isolated into the traditional working-age subset, growth in both employment levels and population levels are totaled by decade, an employment percentage rate is also displayed for comparison by decade.

When examined, by decade, the first decade of the 2000s, the United States suffered a 5% jobless rate when compared to the added working age population.

U.S. Growth: Employment level growth Vs. population level growth by decade
	Civilian noninstitutional population			Working-age population	Employment levels			Working-age employment	
Year	Age: 16 years & over	Age: 65 yrs. & over	Age: 16 to 65 yrs.	Growth – decade	Age: 16 years & over	Age: 65 yrs. & over	Age: 16 to 65	Growth – decade	Percent emp.
1948	103,468,000	10,881,000	92,587,000		58,554,000	2,906,000	55,648,000		
1949	104,524,000	11,191,000	**93,333,000**	—	57,712,000	2,926,000	**54,786,000**	—	—
1950	104,872,000	11,534,000	93,338,000		59,352,000	2,845,000	56,507,000		
1951	104,810,000	11,918,000	92,892,000		60,252,000	2,858,000	57,394,000		
1952	105,812,000	12,334,000	93,478,000		60,748,000	3,000,000	57,748,000		
1953	107,623,000	13,257,000	94,366,000		59,796,000	2,882,000	56,914,000		
1954	108,892,000	13,520,000	95,372,000		59,990,000	2,963,000	57,027,000		
1955	110,296,000	13,925,000	96,371,000		63,268,000	3,213,000	60,055,000		
1956	111,526,000	14,215,000	97,311,000		63,619,000	3,213,000	60,406,000		
1957	113,013,000	14,516,000	98,497,000		63,598,000	3,089,000	60,509,000		
1958	114,429,000	14,821,000	99,608,000		63,266,000	2,855,000	60,411,000		
1959	116,040,000	15,148,000	**100,892,000**	**7,559,000**	64,927,000	3,024,000	**61,903,000**	**7,117,000**	94.15%
1960	118,001,000	15,508,000	102,493,000		65,287,000	3,176,000	62,111,000		
1961	119,214,000	15,861,000	103,353,000		65,531,000	2,885,000	62,646,000		
1962	121,236,000	16,880,000	104,356,000		66,585,000	2,821,000	63,764,000		
1963	123,360,000	17,014,000	106,346,000		67,791,000	2,765,000	65,026,000		
1964	125,468,000	17,296,000	108,172,000		69,543,000	2,913,000	66,630,000		
1965	127,294,000	17,580,000	109,714,000		71,819,000	2,926,000	68,893,000		
1966	128,730,000	17,860,000	110,870,000		73,600,000	2,892,000	70,708,000		
1967	130,936,000	18,194,000	112,742,000		75,337,000	3,030,000	72,307,000		
1968	133,120,000	18,500,000	114,620,000		76,699,000	3,086,000	73,613,000		
1969	135,489,000	18,825,000	**116,664,000**	**15,772,000**	78,789,000	3,069,000	**75,720,000**	**13,817,000**	87.60%
1970	138,529,000	19,202,000	119,327,000		78,651,000	3,032,000	75,619,000		
1971	141,666,000	19,605,000	122,061,000		80,527,000	3,005,000	77,522,000		
1972	145,446,000	20,229,000	125,217,000		83,424,000	2,909,000	80,515,000		
1973	148,479,000	20,536,000	127,943,000		86,390,000	2,787,000	83,603,000		
1974	151,494,000	21,214,000	130,280,000		86,169,000	2,794,000	83,375,000		
1975	154,589,000	21,803,000	132,786,000		86,689,000	2,680,000	84,009,000		
1976	157,438,000	22,309,000	135,129,000		89,850,000	2,791,000	87,059,000		
1977	160,377,000	22,874,000	137,503,000		94,183,000	2,903,000	91,280,000		
1978	163,272,000	23,450,000	139,822,000		97,669,000	3,006,000	94,663,000		
1979	166,300,000	24,067,000	**142,233,000**	**25,569,000**	100,013,000	3,002,000	**97,011,000**	**21,291,000**	83.27%
1980	168,883,000	24,597,000	144,286,000		99,579,000	2,907,000	96,672,000		
1981	171,166,000	25,109,000	146,057,000		99,562,000	2,928,000	96,634,000		
1982	173,199,000	25,619,000	147,580,000		98,849,000	2,878,000	95,971,000		
1983	175,121,000	26,160,000	148,961,000		102,803,000	2,878,000	99,925,000		
1984	177,306,000	26,712,000	150,594,000		106,049,000	2,797,000	103,252,000		
1985	179,112,000	27,266,000	151,846,000		108,063,000	2,841,000	105,222,000		
1986	181,547,000	27,791,000	153,756,000		110,588,000	2,909,000	107,679,000		
1987	183,620,000	28,362,000	155,258,000		113,679,000	3,126,000	110,553,000		
1988	185,402,000	28,875,000	156,527,000		115,978,000	3,264,000	112,714,000		
1989	187,165,000	29,462,000	**157,703,000**	**15,470,000**	117,698,000	3,352,000	**114,346,000**	**17,335,000**	112.06%
1990	190,017,000	29,453,000	160,564,000		118,110,000	3,256,000	114,854,000		
1991	191,798,000	29,893,000	161,905,000		117,395,000	3,193,000	114,202,000		
1992	193,784,000	30,396,000	163,388,000		118,990,000	3,341,000	115,649,000		
1993	195,794,000	30,784,000	165,010,000		121,578,000	3,394,000	118,184,000		
1994	197,765,000	31,181,000	166,584,000		124,729,000	3,641,000	121,088,000		
1995	199,508,000	31,629,000	167,879,000		125,136,000	3,676,000	121,460,000		
1996	201,636,000	31,902,000	169,734,000		127,903,000	3,807,000	124,096,000		
1997	204,098,000	32,071,000	172,027,000		130,785,000	3,933,000	126,852,000		
1998	206,270,000	32,275,000	173,995,000		132,732,000	3,855,000	128,877,000		
1999	208,832,000	32,538,000	**176,294,000**	**18,591,000**	134,696,000	3,984,000	**130,712,000**	**16,366,000**	88.03%
2000	213,736,000	33,590,000	180,146,000		137,846,000	4,244,000	133,602,000		
2001	216,315,000	33,823,000	182,492,000		136,269,000	4,300,000	131,969,000		
2002	218,741,000	34,004,000	184,737,000		136,599,000	4,248,000	132,351,000		
2003	222,509,000	34,432,000	188,077,000		138,556,000	4,711,000	133,845,000		
2004	224,640,000	34,796,000	189,844,000		140,278,000	4,902,000	135,376,000		
2005	227,425,000	35,208,000	192,217,000		142,918,000	5,263,000	137,655,000		
2006	230,108,000	35,841,000	194,267,000		146,081,000	5,617,000	140,464,000		
2007	233,156,000	36,603,000	196,553,000		146,334,000	5,787,000	140,547,000		
2008	235,035,000	37,522,000	197,513,000		143,350,000	6,084,000	137,266,000		
2009	236,924,000	38,362,000	**198,562,000**	**22,268,000**	137,953,000	6,193,000	**131,760,000**	**1,048,000**	4.71%
2010	238,889,000	39,045,000	199,844,000		139,159,000	6,376,000	132,783,000		
2011	240,584,000	40,364,000	200,220,000		140,681,000	6,893,000	133,788,000		
2012	244,350,000	42,695,000	201,655,000		143,060,000	7,412,000	135,648,000		
2013	246,745,000	44,155,000	202,590,000		144,423,000	7,748,000	136,675,000		
2014	249,027,000	45,685,000	203,342,000		147,190,000	8,140,000	139,050,000		
2015	251,936,000	47,269,000	204,667,000		149,703,000	8,552,000	141,151,000		
2016	254,742,000	48,837,000	**205,905,000**	**7,343,000**	151,798,000	8,820,000	**142,978,000**	**11,218,000**	152.77%
**Pre and Post 2000 Comparisons (working age)**
				**Pop. Growth**				**Employment Growth**	
1900s	**1950 to 1999**			82,961,000				75,926,000	91.52%
2000s	**2000 to 2016**			29,611,000				12,266,000	41.42%
**Bold** denotes datum used to produce "Working-Age: Growth Decade" calculation Decade example = End of year 1949 to end of year 1959; Source: Bureau of Labor Statistics, Current Population Survey
Series Id: LNU00000000 Not Seasonally Adjusted Series title: (Unadj.) population Level; Labor force status: Civilian noninstitutional population age: 16 years and over
Series Id: LNU02000000 Not Seasonally Adjusted Series title: (Unadj.) employment Level; Labor force status: Employed Age: 16 years and over
Series Id:LNU00000097 Not Seasonally Adjusted Series title: (Unadj.) population Level - 65 yrs. & over Labor force status: Civilian noninstitutional population age: 65 years and over
Series Id: LNU02000097 Not Seasonally Adjusted Series title: (Unadj.) employment Level - 65 yrs. & over Labor force status: Employed Age: 65 years and over

== See also ==
- Deindustrialization
- Employment-to-population ratio
- Ghost job
- Global labor arbitrage
- Involuntary unemployment
- Lost Decades
- Offshoring
- Structural unemployment
