= IvyGate =

American student blog

- Website type: Blog
- Creators: Chris Beam and Nick Summers
- Website: www.ivygateblog.com
- Launched: 2006
- Current status: Inactive

IvyGate was a blog and online news source covering news and gossip at Ivy League universities. The site was written and edited by students and recent graduates.

== History ==
IvyGate was founded in 2006 by Columbia University alumni Chris Beam and Nick Summers. The blog covers the "follies" of Ivy League schools, such as a Princeton University class president accused of setting a squirrel on fire, a University of Pennsylvania graduate student who turned out to be in prison, and a Yale Skull and Bones member arrested for burning an American Flag.

The former IvyGate logo, designed by Kyle Jaster

IvyGate rose to prominence through its investigative reporting of the details of the "Impossible is Nothing" Internet meme, concerning an impossibly boastful video résumé produced by then Yale student Aleksey Vayner. It was a nominee for the 2006 Weblog Award for "Best Educational Blog".

A minor controversy arose in December 2006 involving Beam's father, prominent Boston Globe columnist Alex Beam. The younger Beam had covered a Brown University professor who wrote prolific letters to the editor in The New York Times. Five days later the elder Beam covered the same story in his column, without attribution, leading to humorous but well-publicized complaints of plagiarism.

Beam has written for the online magazine Slate and The New Republic, and his fellow Columbia graduate Nick Summers is an editor for The New York Times.

The blog was the first to publish results of the U.S. News & World Report 2007 college rankings. It also broke the scoop on the disbanding of a Yale fraternity, and broke the Pi Phi Rush Guidelines controversy at Cornell. Adam Clark Estes, a former editor at IvyGate, was criticized for making fun of the death of a Cornell student who had died due to swine flu in 2009. It employs reporters and commentators throughout the Ivy League, though reporting is sometimes viewed as displaying favoritism.

IvyGate's last post was published in October 2015. In 2018, the site was taken offline. Its archives can still be found using the Wayback Machine.
