= Boss Zhipin =

Chinese recruitment company

Kanzhun Limited
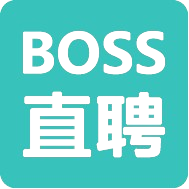
- Trade name: Boss Zhipin
- Native name: 看准科技有限公司
- Company type: Public
- Traded as: Nasdaq: BZ; SEHK: 2076
- Industry: Professional services
- Founded: 16 January 2014; 12 years ago
- Founders: Peng Zhao
- Headquarters: Beijing, China
- Key people: Peng Zhao (chairman & CEO)
- Products: Boss Zhipin
- Revenue: ▲CN¥5.95 billion (2023)
- Net income: ▲CN¥1.10 billion (2023)
- Total assets: ▲CN¥17.94 billion (2023)
- Total equity: ▲CN¥13.43 billion (2023)
- Number of employees: 5,346 (2023)
- Website: ir.zhipin.com

Kanzhun Limited (also referred to as Kanzhun and Boss Zhipin; Chinese: 看准科技有限公司; pinyin: Kànzhǔn Kējì Yǒuxiàn Gōngsī) is a publicly listed Chinese human resources company that focuses on providing online recruitment services through its mobile app, Boss Zhipin (Chinese: BOSS直聘; lit. 'Boss direct hire').

== Background ==
Kanzhun was founded originally as a company review website. It later launched the mobile app, Boss Zhipin which focused on the recruitment industry. This attracted notable investors such as Lei Jun, Neil Shen and Tencent that provided funding to the company.

The company grew quickly to become the largest online recruitment platform in China. By 2021, it had 100 million users and over 6 million partnering companies. The Boss Zhipin app made use of artificial intelligence to power its recommendation algorithm that would help match users’ work experience and qualifications with job listings. It also allowed direct connections between job seekers and employers.

In June 2021, Kanzhun held its initial public offering by becoming a listed company on the Nasdaq raising $912 million. On the first day of trading, its shares rose 96%.

In July 2021, the Cyberspace Administration of China (CAC) announced it would be conducting a cybersecurity review of Kanzhun related to its collection and use of personal information. As a result, Kanzhun's new user registration was halted. In June 2022, the CAC completed its review and Kanzhun rectified problems found during it. As a result, Kanzhun was approved to resume new user registration.

In December 2022, Kanzhun became a dual-listed company after it listed its shares on the Hong Kong Stock Exchange.
