= Job loss =

Job loss may refer to:

- Termination of employment, loss of one's job
  - Dismissal (employment), termination by the employer for reasons related to the employee
  - Layoff, or downsizing, termination by the employer for business reasons
  - Resignation, termination by the employee
- Unemployment, affected by losses of jobs from a company, market, or economy

== See also ==
- Job losses caused by the Great Recession
- Job security
