= Curriculum vitae =

Summary of career

Example of the type of extensive CV used in academia, in this case 69 pages long

In English, a curriculum vitae (Note: In English, the second word vitae may be pronounced in various ways. A common pronunciation is /ˈviːtaɪ/, which is the pronunciation of Latin commonly taught in school in the past, or less commonly /ˈwiːtaɪ/, the one increasingly taught today. Another less common possibility is /ˈvaɪtiː/.) (Latin for "course of life"), commonly known as CV, is a short written summary of a person's career, qualifications, and education. This is the most common usage in British English. In North America, the term résumé (also spelled resume) is used, referring to a short career summary, whereas CVs are much longer than resumes.

The term curriculum vitae and its abbreviation, CV, are also used especially in academia to refer to extensive or even complete summaries of a person's career, qualifications, and education, including publications and other information. This has caused the widespread misconception that it is incorrect to refer to short CVs as CVs in American English and that short CVs should be called résumés, but this is not supported by the usage recorded in American dictionaries. For example, the University of California, Davis notes that "[i]n the United States and Canada, CV and resume are sometimes used interchangeably" while describing the common distinction made in North-American academia between the use of these terms to refer to documents with different contents and lengths.

In many countries, a short CV is typically the first information that a potential employer receives from a job-seeker, and CVs are typically used to screen applicants, often followed by an interview. CVs may also be requested for applicants to postsecondary programs, scholarships, grants, and bursaries. In the 2010s, it became popular for applicants to provide an electronic version of their CV to employers by email, through an employment website, or published on a job-oriented social-networking service such as LinkedIn.

In the United States, both a CV and resume represent experiences and skills and are used in application processes, but they serve different purposes. A CV presents a full history of academic accomplishments, while a resume provides a concise summary of qualifications. Both are tailored for specific positions, with CVs typically required for academic positions and resumes needed otherwise. In the U.S., most employers use resumes for non-academic positions, which are one or two page summaries of experience, education, and skills. Employers rarely spend more than a few minutes reviewing a resume, so successful resumes are concise with enough white space to make them easy to scan. A CV, by contrast, is a longer synopsis of educational and academic background as well as teaching and research experience, publications, awards, presentations, honors, and additional details.

== Contents ==
=== General usage ===
In general usage in all English-speaking countries, a CV is short (usually a maximum of two sides of A4 paper), and therefore contains only a summary of the job seeker's employment history, qualifications, education, and some personal information. A CV's format is not fixed: its main purpose to impress an employer, showcasing skills, experience and creativity. A short CV is often referred to as a résumé only in North America, where it is however also often called a CV outside academia. CVs are often tailored to change the emphasis of the information according to the particular position for which the job seeker is applying. A CV can also be extended to include an extra page for the jobseeker's publications if these are important for the job.

A comprehensive CV should include several standard sections: a heading with name, address, telephone number and email address; education history listing degrees earned and specialized training received; professional history or research experience relevant to the position; and clearly stated research interests.

=== In academia ===
In academic and medical careers, a CV is usually a comprehensive document that provides extensive information on education, publications, and other achievements. Such a CV is generally used when applying for a position in academia, while shorter CVs (also called résumés in North America) are generally used when applying for a position in industry, non-profit organizations, and the public sector. In recent years, there has been a move by research funding organizations, supported by the responsible research movement, towards the use of narrative academic CV formats, intended to add more emphasis to the societal relevance of a scientist's research, teaching, and outreach work. In October 2024, the Government of Canada's main research granting councils—NSERC, SSHRC, and CIHR—announced "... a new CV template that would allow applicants to include a free-form narrative personal statement, aligning with trends seen in other funding agencies like the US National Institutes of Health and UK Research and Innovation".

== Etymology, spelling, and plural ==
The term curriculum vitae can be loosely translated as '[the] course of [one's] life'. It is a loanword from Neo-Latin, which is why it was traditionally spelled curriculum vitæ using the ligature æ, also in English, (Note: See list of English words that may be spelled with a ligature.) but this is now rare.

In English, the plural of curriculum alone is often curriculums instead of the traditional Latin plural curricula, which is why both forms are recorded in English dictionaries. The English plural of curriculum vitae is however almost always curricula vitae as in Latin, and this is the only form recorded in the Merriam-Webster, American Heritage, and Oxford English dictionaries, for example (the very rare claim that the Latin plural should be curricula vitarum is in fact a hypercorrection based on superficial knowledge of Latin; although it would be technically acceptable (though arguably pretentious) if referring to a group of CVs of different people).

== See also ==
- Applicant tracking system
- Background check
- Cover letter
- .cv
- Europass – European Standardised model
- Human resources
- Résumé fraud
- Video résumé
