= Biodata =

Bio data

Biodata is the shortened form for biographical data.

The term has two usages: In South Asia, the term carries the same meaning as a résumé or curriculum vitae (CV), for the purposes of jobs, grants, and marriage. While in industrial and organizational psychology, it is used as a predictor for future behaviours; in this sense, biodata is "factual kinds of questions about life and work experiences, as well as items involving opinions, values, beliefs, and attitudes that reflect a historical perspective."

== In South Asia ==
In South Asia (India, Pakistan, Afghanistan, Bangladesh and Nepal), a biodata (a shortened form of biographical data) is essentially a résumé or curriculum vitae (CV), for the purposes of jobs, grants, and marriage. The purpose is similar to that of a résumé—to choose certain individuals from the pool of prospective candidates. The biodata generally contains the same type of information as a résumé (i.e. objective, work history, salary information, educational background, as well as personal details with respect to religion and nationality), but may also include physical attributes, such as height, weight, hair/eye colour, and a photograph.

== Industrial and organizational psychology ==
With respect to industrial and organizational psychology, since the respondent replies to questions about themselves, there are elements of both biography and autobiography. The basis of biodata's predictive abilities is the axiom that past behaviour is the best predictor of future behaviour. Biographical information is not expected to predict all future behaviours but it is useful in personal selection in that it can give an indication of probable future behaviours based on an individual's prior learning history. Biodata instruments (also called Biographical Information Blanks) have an advantage over personality and interest inventories in that they can capture directly the past behaviour of a person, probably the best predictor of his or her future actions. These measures deal with facts about the person's life, not introspections and subjective judgements.

Over the years, personnel selection has relied on standardized psychological tests. The five major categories for these tests are intellectual abilities, spatial and mechanical abilities, perceptual accuracy, motor abilities and personality tests. The mean correlation coefficient for a standardized test of g (intellectual ability) and job performance is 0.51. A review of 58 studies on biodata found coefficients that ranged from 0.32 to 0.46 with a mean validity of 0.35 The mean validity of interviews was found to be 0.19. research has indicated a validity coefficient of 0.29 for unstructured interviews and 0.31 for structured interviews but interview results can be affected by interviewer biases and have been challenged in a number of different court cases.

Biodata has been shown to be a valid and reliable means to predict future performance based on an applicant's past performance. A well-constructed biodata instrument is legally defendable and unlike the interview, is not susceptible to error due to rater biases or the halo effect. It has proven its worth in personnel selection as a cost-effective tool.
