= Fake job =

Fake job may refer to:

- Ghost job – benefiting the employer
- Fictitious employment – benefiting the employee
