= Workable =

Workable may refer to:

- Shek Kip Mei SA, a football club which play under the name Workable FC in 2007–2008 season in Hong Kong First Division League
- Workable FC, a Hong Kong football club, played in Hong Kong First Division League in the 2007–08 season
- Workable (software), a software-as-a-service (SAAS) that provides applicant tracking system (ATS) and recruitment software.
