= World of Art Brut Culture =

- Established: 11 October 2010; 14 years ago
- Type: Private Non-profit Organization
- Headquarters: Shanghai, China
- Director-General: Miao Shiming
- Website: www.wabcchina.org

The World of Art Brut Culture (WABC) (simplified Chinese: 无障碍艺途; traditional Chinese: 無障礙藝途; pinyin: Wú zhàng'ài yì tú)is an education program for mentally disabled people founded in Shanghai in 2010 as a private non-profit organization providing the special needs population with artistic potentials development courses.

== Idea ==
The purpose of WABC is to use contemporary art and culture as a medium to educate and enhance the spiritual life quality of people with disabilities. WABC hopes to transcend the simple form of material support and explore the art as a treatment method for special needs in China.

== History ==
=== Establishment ===
By chance (the first Beijing 798 Biennale wabc project in 2009), the WABC founder Miao Shiming walked into the "special needs of the crowd" and the reality deeply shocked him. Combined with his past artistic training and teaching experience, Miao Shiming tried to make friends with them in the way of art. It is a very wonderful experience. During the teaching process, Miao Shiming discovered that many of them had artistic talent, and that artistic practice did improve their psychological state and mood to a certain extent. Later, Miao Shiming learned that there were similar foreign specialized agencies and organizations, why China cannot have it too! Miao Shiming thought this was a cause worth fighting for, though difficult, but of great significance.

== History ==
WABC Timeline
| Date | Name |
|---|---|
| (2009) | For more than a month, WABC was born in the first WABC project at the 798 Biennale in Beijing, an artist's education program for those with mental disabilities. For more than a month, artists led volunteers into the community to develop the artistic potential of people with intellectual disabilities, Involved in painting, photography, sculpture, architecture, and eventually made a unique exhibition in 798. |
| (2010.4) | Following a three-month artistic potential development for some mentally disabled students in Shanghai's Luwan District, the founders of the organization went to Shanghai in July and gave a "born-to-me" exhibition in July, arousing Social concerns. |
| (2010.8) | In Shanghai Civil Affairs Bureau registered a "Shanghai Arts and accessible studios," private non-enterprise units, and set up the Council of institutions |
| (2010.10.11) | WABC formally held the ceremony at the Fonda Law Firm of Shanghai Jinmao Tower. About 70 WABC artists were exhibited at the establishment ceremony of the agency and related derivative products were exhibited. Ms. on the spot decided to WABC students a portrait of "Obama" to the serving U.S. President Barack Obama |
| (2011) | WABC was registered in Beijing as "Art Troupe Social Work Office in Chaoyang District, Beijing" |
| (2012) | WABC Chengdu Office was established and WABC served 11 in Shanghai and seven communities and schools in Beijing. |

== Founder ==
Miao Shiming graduated from the Central Academy of Fine Arts painting, is a successful artist and professional curator, has its own studio. By chance, Miao Shiming has stepped into the lives of the mentally and mentally disabled, and has firmly determined his lifelong determination to work for the artistic cause of the disabled. After years of substantive activities to promote, the concept of the organization is accepted by more and more people. In 2009, he founded the Welfare Project "WABC Barrier-free Art Fair" and planned the 2009 WABC Plan for the first Beijing 798 Biennale 2010 Forbes Forbes2010 Chinese charity fund to accept the public venture January 2011 participated in Ningxia TV broadcast "who come with lunch" program. February 2011 Wen Wei Po headline interview to accept an exclusive - to borrow the pen to release "wandering creativity".July 2011 Hold "The Beauty of the Mind" Top Ten Artists' Award Ceremony and Copyright Licensing Ceremony. October 2011 Shooting with CCTV "Dream Choir" project

== Important Events ==
=== One yuan Purchase ===
August 29, 2017, WeChat circle of friends was a piece of "children" painting as a screen. This reporter has learned that the "one dollar purchase" fund-raising activities are sponsored by Tencent public platform, painting by disabled people in the WABC barrier-free Yitu public institutions. WeChat users can to buy a dollar price paintings, save into wallpaper use. "One dollar purchase" donation activities to complete the target of 15 million yuan, was completed in the afternoon of August 28, 2017. More than 5.8 million people participated in the event. Organizers of the event, Tencent Charity, said that proceeds will be credited directly to the public offering to help special groups with mental disorders and intellectual disabilities integrate into society. Miao Shiming, the project's promoter, said he was pleased that his work was endorsed by everyone and also surprised by the support from netizens. For questions from the outside world, the project leader said that the paintings are all author's gifts plus diligent output and should not be subjected to such criticisms. On August 31, in the morning, from the office of Shenzhen Social Management Office, Shenzhen Aiyu Future Charity Foundation reported to Shenzhen Municipal Civil Affairs Bureau about this "one yuan purchase" activity last week. Shenzhen Civil Affairs Bureau will openly report the situation in these days. On September 4, 2017, "One Dollar Purchase" project beneficiary recipient - Shenzhen Aiyu Future Charity Foundation announced the plan to use donation on its official website to announce "Charity for Public Life with Art Lightning" Instructions for use

== See also ==
- Special education in China
