= Job fraud =

Fluffed or misleading resume to deceive an employer and trying to get hired

Job fraud is fraudulent or deceptive activity or representation on the part of an employee or prospective employee toward an employer. It is not to be confused with employment fraud, where an employer scams job seekers or fails to pay wages for work performed. There are several types of job frauds that employees or potential employees commit against employers. While some may be illegal under jurisdictional laws, others do not violate law but may be held by the employer against the employee or applicant.

== Résumé fraud ==
Résumé fraud or application fraud is any act that involves intentionally providing fictitious, exaggerated, or otherwise misleading information on a job application or résumé in hopes of persuading a potential employer to hire an applicant for a job for which they may be unqualified or less qualified than other applicants.

- Use of AI to generate misleading content: The proliferation of artificial intelligence tools has led to a trend of applicants generating entire resumes and cover letters with AI. While not inherently fraudulent, this practice can cross into fraud when the AI is used to invent or grossly exaggerate skills, projects, and experiences to match a job description perfectly. A 2024 Forbes report noted that up to 80% of hiring managers discard applications they identify as AI-generated due to concerns about authenticity and the candidate's true qualifications.

=== Demographics ===
Younger, more junior people are likelier to have a discrepancy on their CV. Someone in a junior administrative position is 23% more likely to have a discrepancy on their CV than in a managerial role. An applicant aged under 20 is 26% more likely to have a discrepancy than a 51- to 60-year-old. A 2025 survey of about 1,000 workers by the career platform Kickresume similarly found differences by generation: 6% of Generation Z respondents admitted to inflating job titles, dates, or qualifications on their résumé and 16% to exaggerating their impact, compared with 4% and 8% among Generation X respondents.

A 2008 study found a discrepancy in the CVs of 14% of those who had graduated from top 20 universities compared to 43% of those who had graduated from a low-ranked university. Maths graduates had the lowest proportion of discrepancies, 6%.

== Types of fraud ==
Job fraud encompasses a variety of schemes that exploit job seekers. Common types include:

- Exploitative application tasks. In this model, a fraudulent employer posts a job opening for a creative or technical role (such as a writer, designer, or programmer) and assigns applicants a substantial "assessment" task. These tasks are often real work projects the company needs completed. The applicant is led to believe this is a standard part of the hiring process. After submitting the high-quality work, the applicant is rejected and their work is used by the company without compensation. Professional organizations, like the AIGA for designers, strongly advise against this practice as it constitutes unethical, free speculative work.
- Data harvesting for identity theft. Some fraudulent job listings are created solely to collect a high volume of resumes. The personal information on these resumes—including names, addresses, phone numbers, and employment history—is then packaged and sold to criminals. This data can be used to commit identity theft, create more convincing phishing attacks, or add credibility to other scams. The U.S. Federal Trade Commission warns that personal information provided on job applications can be misused in this manner.
- Deceptive recruitment for multi-level marketing (MLM). Many multi-level marketing companies use misleading job advertisements that promise a salaried position (e.g., "Marketing Manager," "Sales Executive") to lure applicants. Victims, believing they are attending a traditional job interview, are instead brought into a high-pressure group seminar. The "interview" is revealed to be a recruitment pitch designed to persuade them to pay for a starter kit or join the MLM as an independent distributor, earning income through commissions rather than a salary. The Federal Trade Commission lists such deceptive job postings as a common red flag for identifying problematic MLM schemes.
- Fake remote job offers leading to payment scams. With the rise of remote work, a common scam involves offering a victim a job and then requiring them to pay for their own equipment (like a laptop) from a specific, fraudulent vendor. The scammer promises reimbursement that never arrives. A variation involves sending the victim a fake check for equipment and initial expenses. The victim deposits the check, is instructed to send a portion of the funds to the "equipment vendor," and the original check later bounces, leaving the victim responsible for the full amount sent to the scammer. The U.S. Federal Trade Commission has issued specific warnings about these types of employment scams.
- Luring for physical assault or human trafficking. In the most dangerous cases, fraudulent job offers are used as a pretext to lure victims to a physical location for a "job interview" or "training session." The isolated setting is then used to commit robbery, physical or sexual assault, or to coerce the victim into human trafficking. Law enforcement agencies like the FBI frequently issue public warnings advising job seekers to be cautious of interviews in non-professional locations and to verify the legitimacy of an employer before meeting in person.
