= Recruitee =

Dutch software

Tellent Recruitee
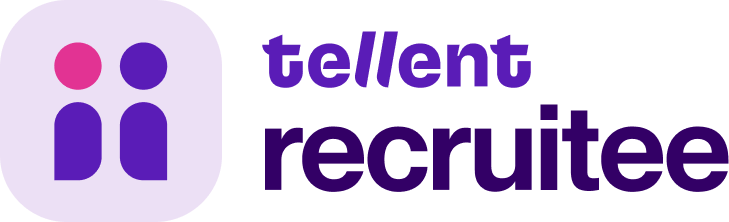
- Original authors: Perry Oostdam; Pawel Smoczyk
- Developer: Tellent
- Release: August 2015; 11 years ago
- Operating system: Cross-platform
- Platform: Software as a service, Web application
- Type: Applicant tracking system Recruitment software
- Website: recruitee.com

Tellent Recruitee is a computerized cloud-based applicant tracking system (ATS) for recruiting employees. It is owned by Tellent and is used by internal HR teams for processes including job advertisements, finding candidates, reporting, and applicant tracking.

== History ==
Perry Oostdam and Pawel Smoczyk founded Recruitee after working on a mobile gaming startup. The Recruitee was launched in August 2015 and now operates in the USA and in Europe.. In September 2015, the company received a seed funding payment from investors Robert Pijselman and Luc Brandts.

In February 2021, Recruitee and the Finnish HR software provider Sympa merged their operations, backed by the growth equity firm Providence Strategic Growth (PSG). In 2022, the group acquired the French company Javelo and the German company kiwiHR.

The parent company was subsequently renamed as Tellent while Recruitee renamed as Tellent Recruitee and continues to operate as a product unit within the Tellent group.

== Platform ==
Tellent Recruitee is a customizable recruitment software. It functions as an ATS and "talent acquisition platform" and includes tools to create and publish job listings, find candidates, manage recruitment agencies, and track applicants through customizable pipelines. The interface allows drag-and-drop organization of candidates.

The platform also includes features for team collaboration, such as shared notes, task assignments, and candidate evaluations. It also has integrated scheduling tools and automated email communication. Tellent Recruitee also provides analysis and reports on hiring and career site metrics. The software allows for customization of career site pages and application forms. It supports integrations with other HR and productivity software, such as WhatsApp, and has various AI functionalities to support manual recruitment tasks.
