= Video resume =

Recording promoting a job seeker

Video résumé or video resume is a recording promoting a job seeker.

== History ==
Video resumes, sometimes called Visumé or Video CV, were first introduced in the 1980s for use and distribution via VHS tape, but the idea never took off beyond the video taping of interviews. However, with the modern capabilities of transmitting streaming video via the internet, video resumes have taken on new popularity. It is a way for job seekers to showcase their abilities beyond the capabilities of a traditional paper résumé. The video resume allows prospective employers to see and hear applicants, and get a feel for how applicants present themselves.

== Benefits ==
=== Demonstrates Communication Skills ===
Video resumes allow job seekers to showcase their verbal communication skills, an aspect often overlooked in traditional resumes. This medium provides an opportunity to articulate thoughts clearly, display confidence, and convey information effectively.

=== Personalises the Application ===
Unlike traditional résumés, which are limited to text and static formats, video résumés provide a convenient platform for candidates to present themselves. This personal touch can provide employers with a more comprehensive and memorable impression of the applicant, potentially setting them apart from other candidates.

=== Showcases Creativity and Presentation Skills ===
Through video resumes, candidates have the chance to exhibit creativity in their approach to self-presentation. This creativity can be a valuable asset, especially in industries where innovative thinking or presentation skills are highly valued, such as marketing, design, or the arts.

=== Highlights Non-Verbal Cues ===
A video resume allows employers to observe non-verbal cues such as body language, facial expressions, and tone of voice. These elements can provide additional insights into a candidate's demeanour, confidence level, and overall personality, which may not be readily apparent from a traditional resume.

=== Saves Time for Both Parties ===
Video resumes can streamline the initial stages of the recruitment process. Employers can quickly assess a candidate's suitability for a position without the need for extensive reading, potentially saving valuable time in the early stages of candidate screening.

=== Provides a Glimpse of Tech-Savviness ===
The ability to create and submit a video resume demonstrates a certain level of technological proficiency. This skill set can be particularly relevant in industries where familiarity with multimedia tools or online communication platforms is essential.

=== Enhances Cultural Fit Assessment ===
Video resumes can offer insights into how well a candidate might fit within a company's culture. By observing a candidate's presentation style and demeanor, employers can gain a preliminary understanding of whether the applicant aligns with the company's values and work environment.

== Criticism ==
With the popularity of video hosting solutions there has been much debate about the usefulness of video resumes. Most recruiters feel that a video alone does not give an employer enough information about a candidate to make a proper evaluation of the applicant's potential and, more importantly, skills. One article suggests that

"While a video resume introduces applicants on camera, the value such visual imagery adds is debatable. A text resume allows for specific pieces of information to be parsed out and compared across candidates. When the information is delivered verbally, recruiters need to glean the details themselves."

Studies have found that there is a gender discrepancy in video resumes as it is often detrimental for women to exhibit 'masculine' workplace characteristics such as assertiveness, confidence and self-promotion, whereas self-promotion is beneficial for male applicants. There is also an assumption that additional information on age, race, disability, gender and ethnicity provided by video resumes at an early stage in an application process could result in accusations of discrimination. As Hiemstra (2012) states, "There is empirical evidence that e-recruitment practices that are perceived as unfair and intrusive lead to negative applicant reactions, possible legal action, and a tendency to 'self-select out'."

== See also ==
- Applicant tracking system
- Background check
- Cover letter
- Curriculum vitae
