= Biographical Information Blanks =

Biographical Information Blank (BIB) is a type of assessment that uses biodata in employee recruitment to help determine which of several candidates should be hired for a job. Originally companies would take the information from their job applications forms to see what would be useful in predicting the job performance of employees. Over time, the amount and type of biographical information collected by employers has expanded and is now placed into the BIB assessments used today.

The modern BIB is a self-report instrument that includes questions about past personal and work experiences, as well as interests, opinions, values, and attitudes. Its items are all presented in the multiple choice format. The emphasis is on past behaviors because they are best predictors of future behaviors. Typically, BIBs are designed to predict success in a particular job because they contribute to a predictor sample, which is used to make personnel selection decisions.

There are two types of BIBs: the empirical and the rational. With the empirical BIB, each item is correlated with a measure of job performance or other criterion of job success. Those items that can predict job success are retained for the BIB. The rational approach is to start with a job analysis to determine the knowledge, skill, ability, and other job characteristics (KSAOs) needed for the job. Items are chosen that reflect the required KSAOs. Some research has shown that BIBs are able to predict job success. Both types of BIBs, the empirical and the rational seem to work about equally.
