= Workable (software) =

Cloud-based applicant tracking system

- Type: Private
- Industry: Software
- Founded: 2012; 14 years ago in Athens, Greece
- Founders: Nikos Moraitakis; Spyros Magiatis
- Headquarters: Boston, Massachusetts, United States
- Area served: Worldwide
- Key people: Nikos Moraitakis (CEO); Spyros Magiatis (CTO)
- Products: Workable platform
- Services: ATS software HRIS platform Recruiting automation tools
- Website: workable.com

Workable is a developer of cloud-based recruitment and human resources (HR) management software based in Boston, Massachusetts.

== History ==
Workable was founded in June 2012 in Athens by Nikos Moraitakis and Spyros Magiatis to develop recruiting software for small and medium-sized businesses (SMBs). It was launched amid the Greek government-debt crisis, with the founders initially basing operations in a small office in Athens. Its first seed round of approximately $950,000 came largely from JEREMIE-Openfund II, an EU-backed Greek venture capital fund.

In March 2014, Workable raised $1.5 million in a Series A round led by Greylock IL (later renamed as 83North), with participation from Openfund. A year later, in February 2015, Workable received an additional $5 million from existing investors, with the funds intended to expand its operations to the United States. In October 2015, Workable raised $27 million in a Series B round led by Balderton Capital.

In November 2018, Workable raised $50 million in a Series C round led by London-based private equity firm Zouk Capital. In 2020, Workable was included on the Financial Times FT 1000 list of Europe's fastest-growing companies.

As of 2026, Workable has offices in Boston, Massachusetts; London, United Kingdom; Athens, Greece; and Singapore.

== Platform ==
Workable provides cloud-based applicant tracking and recruitment software. The software uses predictive algorithms to recommend candidates for a position based on recruitment and personal data collected from online sources. In 2024, Workable expanded its platform with the launch of a full HRIS for onboarding, time-off tracking, employee record management, and performance management.

== Reception ==
Workable was reviewed by Juan Martinez and Gadjo Sevilla of PCMag in 2019 and wrote positively about the software. Similarly, its platform was reviewed by TechRadar in 2022.
