= Make-work job =

Non-market jobs used to reduce unemployment

A make-work job is a job that is created and maintained at a cost not offset by the job's fulfilment. These roles usually have little or no immediate financial benefit, and can be said to exist for other economic or social-political reasons, for example, simply to provide work-experience or maintain a ceremonial function.

Make-work jobs are similar to workfare, but are publicly offered on the job market and have otherwise normal employment requirements. Workfare jobs, in contrast, may be handed out to a randomly selected applicant or have special requirements such as continuing to search for a non-workfare job.

== Analysis ==
Some consider make-work jobs to be harmful when they provide very little practical experience or training for future careers.

As a part of the New Deal, the Civil Works Administration (CWA) was in 1933 created as a stopgap measure to boost the economic relief provided by the Federal Emergency Relief Administration and Public Works Administration. At its peak, the CWA employed 4,230,000 people; however, President Roosevelt was wary of the specter of corruption and accusations of boondoggling, and shut the CWA down after less than a year. Economists like Milton Friedman considered the programs like the CCC and WPA as justified as a temporary response to an emergency. Friedman gave Roosevelt considerable credit for relieving immediate distress and restoring confidence.

== Examples ==
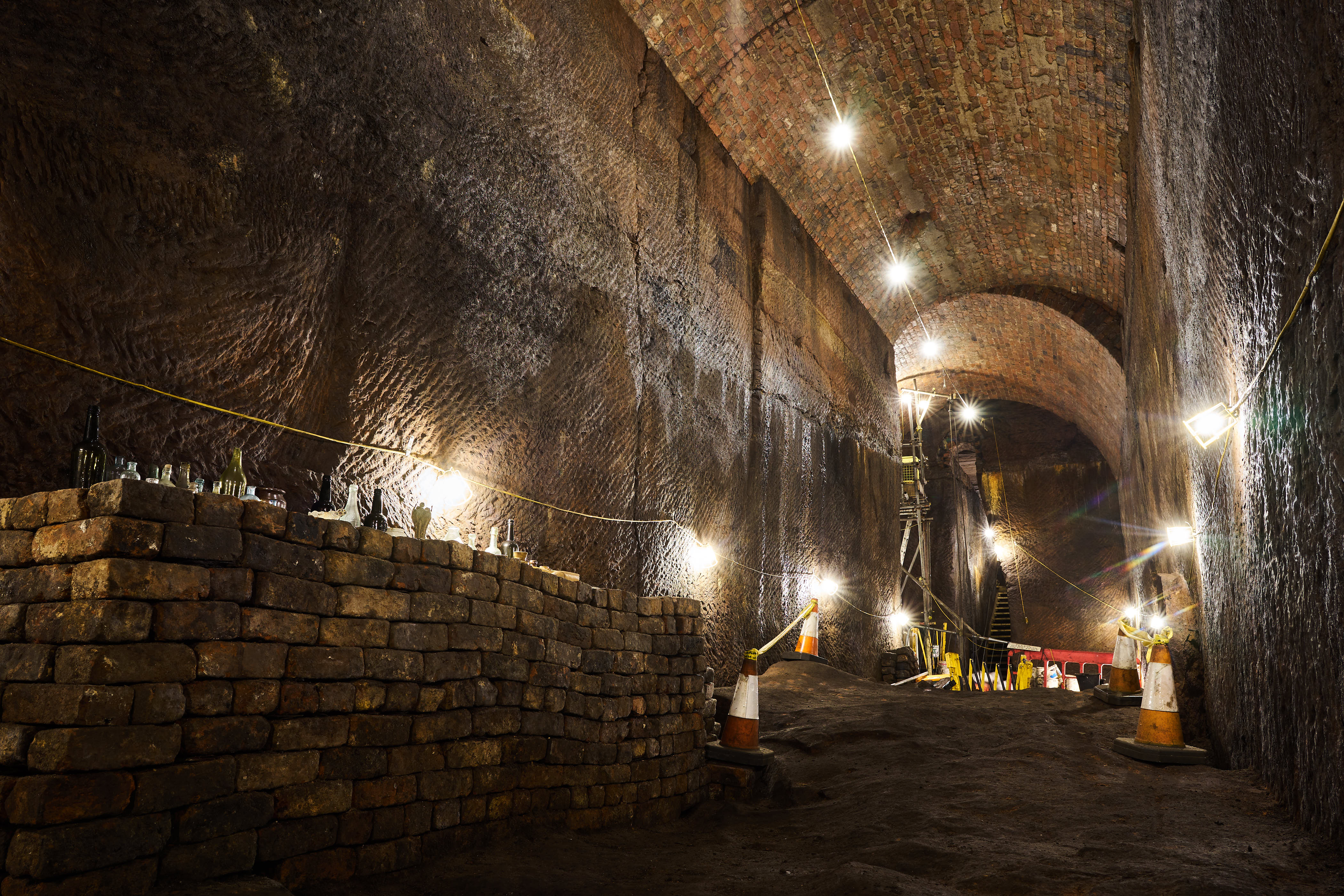
Williamson Tunnels

Make-work jobs have been introduced during periods of high unemployment to provide substitutes for regular jobs. In many European countries, social welfare systems provide cash transfers to those who are unable to secure employment. These programs often require the recipient to undertake job training, internships, or job rotations. Make-work jobs can have the benefit of giving workers the chance of meeting new people and learning how to work with others. Such jobs can also instill necessary workplace skills and values such as the importance of punctuality and responsibility.

Many of the skills learned while doing make-work jobs help workers when applying for and doing regular jobs. Several make-work jobs that were created in Denmark in 2014 were gardening, cleaning up of beaches and sidewalks, reading to the elderly or disabled, washing toys at day care, working with local bike programs, and counting cars.

Attendants employed at full-serve gasoline stations in New Jersey wherein drivers are not permitted to pump their own gas are often cited as examples of make-work jobs.

== See also ==
- Bullshit Jobs
- Busy work
- Capitalist peace theory
- Featherbedding
- Lump of labour fallacy
- Public works
- Rent-seeking
- Sinecure
- Zero-sum thinking
