= Application for employment =

Standard business document

An application for employment or job application is a standard business document that is prepared with questions deemed relevant by employers. It is used to determine the best candidate to fill a specific role within the company. Most companies provide such forms to anyone upon request, at which point the applicant is responsible for completing the form and returning it to the employer for consideration. The completed and returned document notifies the company of the applicant's availability and willingness to be employed, as well as their qualifications and background, so that a determination can be made regarding the candidate's suitability for the position.

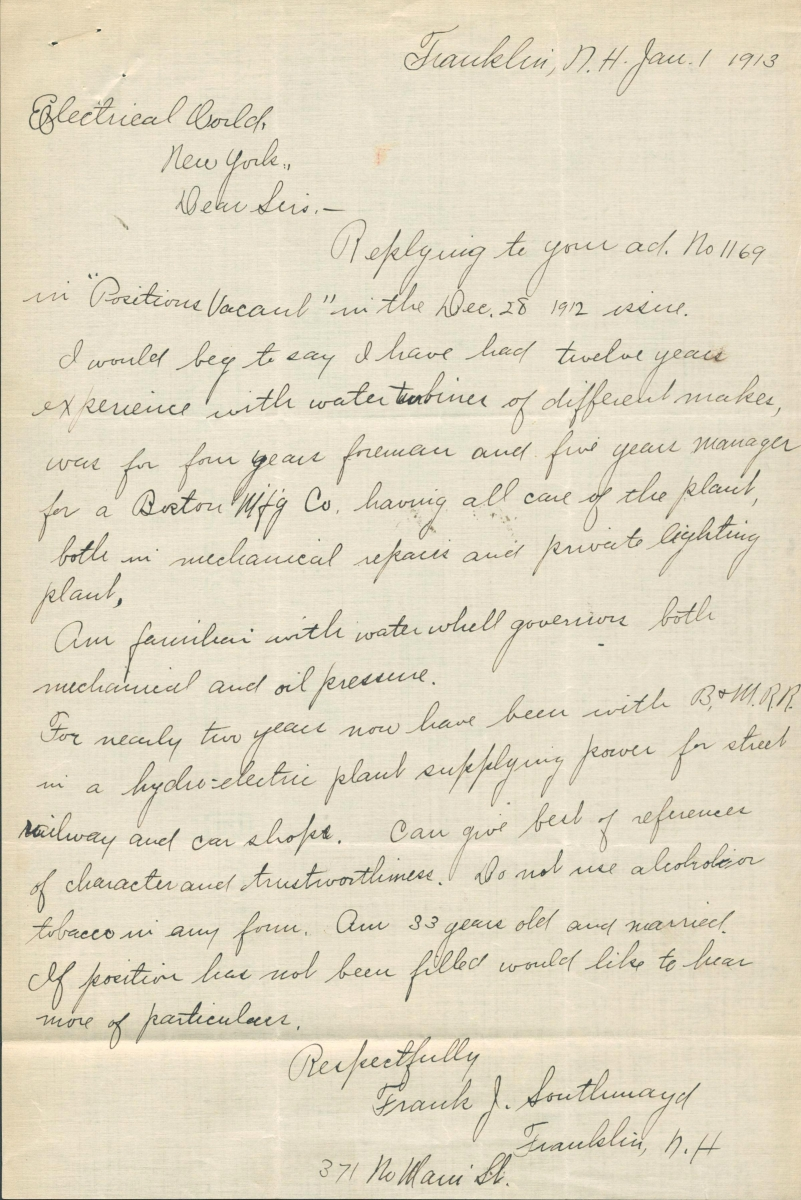
A job application letter dated January 1, 1913

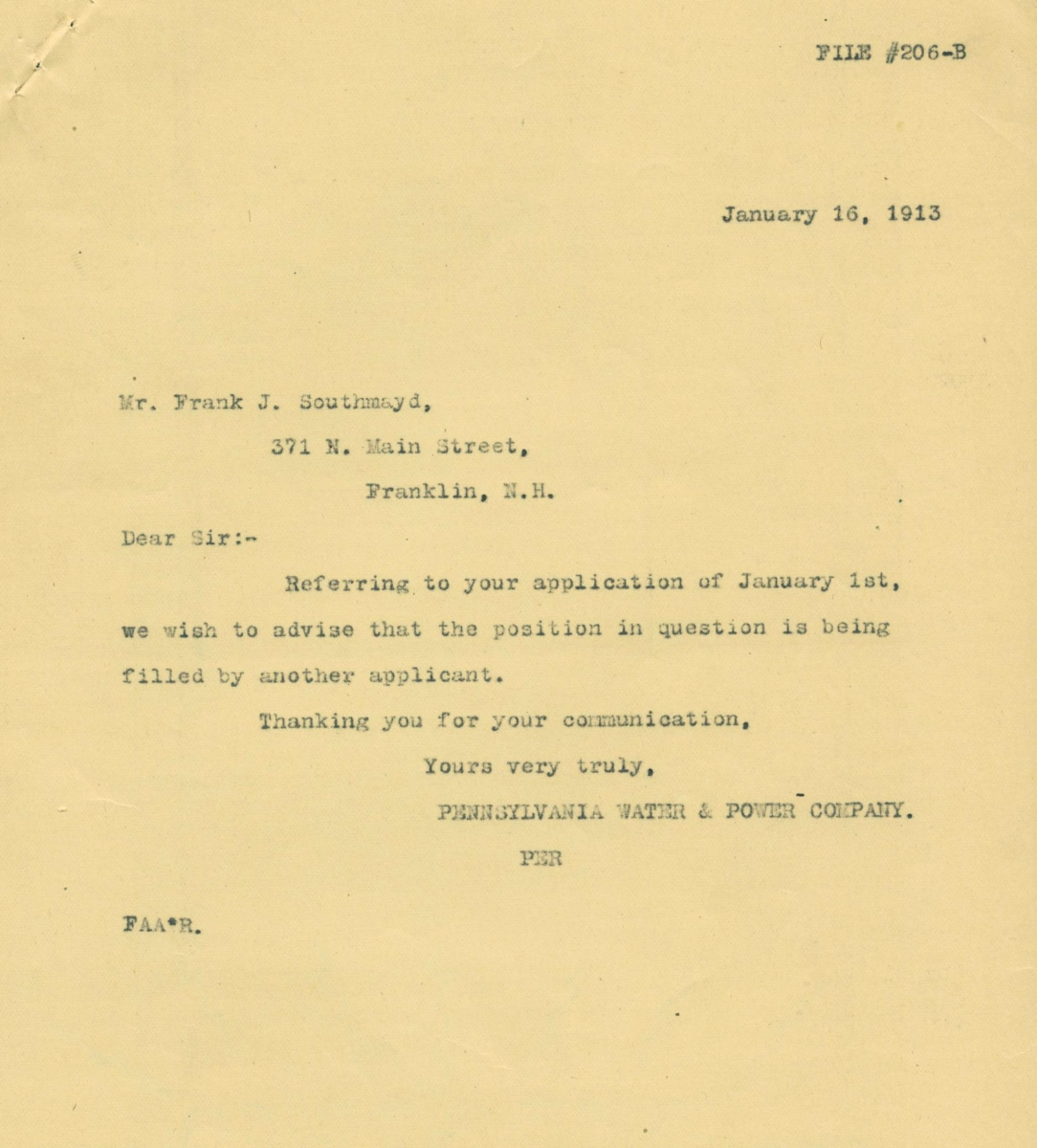
Rejection letter dated January 16, 1913

== Definition ==
From the employer's perspective, the application serves several purposes. These vary depending on the nature of the job and the preferences of the person responsible for hiring, as "each organization should have an application form that reflects its own environment". At a minimum, an application usually requires the applicant to provide information sufficient to demonstrate that they are legally permitted to be employed. The typical application also requires the applicant to provide information regarding relevant skills, education, and experience (previous employment or volunteer work). The application itself is a minor test of the applicant's literacy, penmanship, and communication skills. A careless job applicant might disqualify themselves with a poorly filled-out application.

The application may also require the applicant to disclose any criminal record and provide information sufficient for the employer to conduct an appropriate background check. For a business that employs workers on a part-time basis, the application may ask about the applicant's availability on specific days and/or times, as well as any preferences. Employers may be prohibited from asking applicants about characteristics that are not relevant to the job, such as their political views or sexual orientation.

For white-collar jobs, particularly those requiring communication skills, employers typically require applicants to submit a cover letter and a résumé with the form. However, even employers who accept a cover letter and résumé will frequently also require the applicant to complete an application form, as the other documents may neglect to mention specific details of importance to the employer. In some instances, an application is effectively used to dissuade "walk-in" applicants, serving as a barrier between the applicant and a job interview with the person who has the authority to hire.

For many businesses, employment applications can be completed online rather than submitted in person. However, it is still recommended that applicants bring a printed copy of their application to an interview.

Application forms are the second most common hiring instrument, next to personal interviews. Companies will occasionally use two types of application forms, short and long. They help companies with initial screening and the longer form can be used for other purposes as well. The answers applicants submit are helpful to the company because they can become interview questions for that applicant.

== Standardization and regulation ==
The employment application is not a standardized form, so every company may create its own as long as the regulations set by the government are adhered to.

== Document elements ==
At a minimum, applications ask for the applicant's name, phone number, and address. In addition, applications may also ask for previous employment information, educational background, emergency contacts, and references, as well as any special skills the applicant might have.

The three categories of information that application fields are very useful for discovering are physical characteristics, experience, and environmental factors.

=== Physical characteristics ===
If the company has a bona fide occupational qualification (BFOQ) to ask regarding a physical condition, they may ask questions about it. For example:

The job requires a lot of physical labor. Do you have any physical problems that may interfere with this job?

=== Experience ===
Experience requirements can be divided into two categories in an application: work experience and educational background. Educational background is important because it allows a potential employer to evaluate an applicant's performance in school as well as make determinations as to personality and intelligence. Work experience is important because it helps a potential employer determine whether the applicant meets their specific needs. Companies are usually interested in when applicants were unemployed, when/why the applicant left their previous job, and their highest position at their previous job.

=== Socio-environmental qualifications ===
Companies may be interested in the applicant's social environment because it can inform them of their personality, interests, and qualities. For example, if they are extremely active within an organization, that may demonstrate their ability to communicate well with others. Being in management may demonstrate their leadership and determination.

=== Photograph ===
Customs vary from country to country regarding whether a photograph of the applicant is included. In many English-speaking countries, notably the United States, this is not customary, and books or websites offering guidance on designing an application typically advise against it unless explicitly requested by the employer. In other countries (for instance, Germany), the inclusion of a photograph of the applicant is still common, and many employers would consider an application incomplete without it.

== In other non-English speaking European countries ==
=== France ===
In France, the 2006 Equal Opportunities Act requires companies with more than 50 employees to request an anonymous application (CV anonyme).

=== Germany ===
The job application is called Bewerbung in Germany and usually consists of three parts: the Anschreiben (cover letter), the Lebenslauf (curriculum vitae (CV)) and the Zeugnisse (references). The Anschreiben is used to persuade the employer to invite an applicant to a job interview. It must be in paper size DIN A4, not exceed one page, have a handwritten signature, and be accompanied by a Lebenslauf and Zeugnisse. The Lebenslauf is documented in reverse-chronological order and should provide information on work experience, education, and professional training, as well as the applicant's skills. In Germany, the Lebenslauf usually includes a photograph called Bewerbungsfoto. Some employers, mainly governmental organisations, deliberately neglect the photograph to ensure a higher degree of objectivity in the course of assessment procedures. The Lebenslauf should be two pages long. In general, there are two options for submitting a job application in Germany: a job application folder (Bewerbungsmappe) or online (Onlinebewerbung). According to a study, the Onlinebewerbung was more favored in Germany than the Bewerbungsmappe by 2012.

=== Italy ===
The CV is the most important part of the application and should not be longer than two to three pages. It is divided into three areas:

In chronological order:

- Personal details (Informazioni personali)
- School and education (Studi e Formazione)

In reverse chronological order:

- Additional capabilities/skills (Altre conoscenze)
- Experience (Esperienze professionali). As a graduate, this section is omitted. Brief information on the application motivations may be mentioned here.

The cover letter (La Lettera di accompagnamento al curriculum) is relatively short, polite, and formal in Italian applications. Long versions and detailed explanations of motivations, as well as photos and copies of certificates, are presented only during the interview.

=== Spain ===
In Spain, the application consists of two parts: the cover letter (Carta de Candidatura) and the CV. No work or training certificates are attached. The cover letter should be short and contain the reason for applying. The CV should be structured in a tabular form. In Spain, multiple job interviews with the same company are common.

== Usage by hackers ==
Job applications are known to be used by hackers to trick employees into opening attachments or links, or connecting USB sticks to malware. As companies typically have more financial resources than private individuals, they are often a target of cyberextortion. Ransomware such as "Petya" and "GoldenEye" were discovered to exploit job applications. Cyberespionage and attacks on critical infrastructure-related companies may also be reasons for such attacks, and, unlike ransomware attacks, they may leave employees in the dark about their computer or network infections. The best method for mitigating such risks would be to have the HR department use a separate computer for job applications that are entirely disconnected from the internal network, on which no confidential or valuable information is stored, and to which no portable devices, such as USB sticks, that may get connected to other computers of the company are connected.

== See also ==
- Employment contract
- Human resource management
- Recruitment
- Staffing models
