= Job losses caused by the Great Recession =

Effect of the 2008 financial crisis

Job losses caused by the Great Recession refers to jobs that have been lost worldwide within people since the start of the Great Recession. In the US, job losses have been going on since December 2007, and it accelerated drastically starting in September 2008 following the bankruptcy of Lehman Brothers. By February 2010, the American economy was reported to be more shaky than the economy of Canada. Many service industries (particularly in countries that either have the same unemployment rate as the United States or greater) have reported dropping their prices in order to maximize profit margins (looking to make use of any price elasticity of demand in their market segments). This is an era in which employment is becoming unstable, and in which being either underemployed or unemployed is a common part of life for many people.

== Net job gains and losses by month ==
=== United States ===
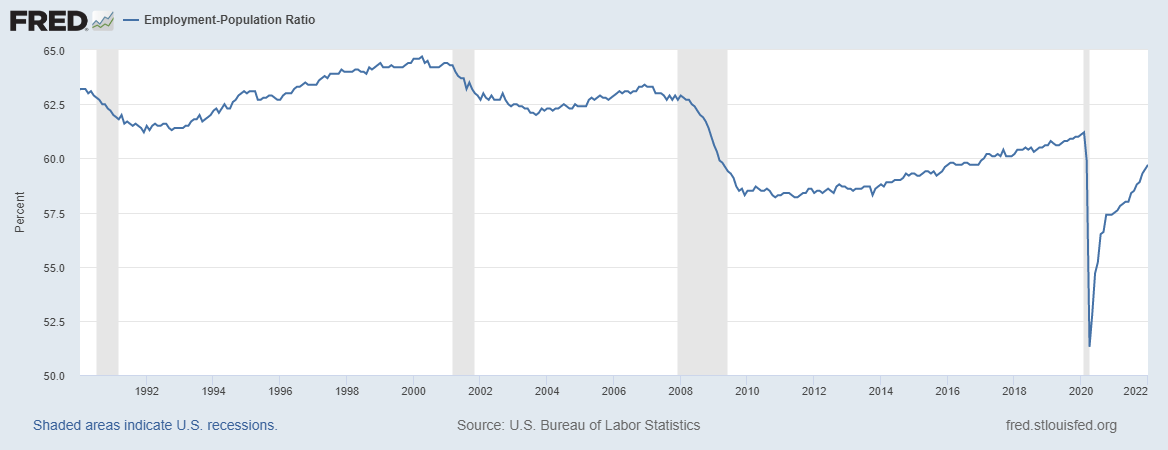
US Employment to population ratio, 1990–2021

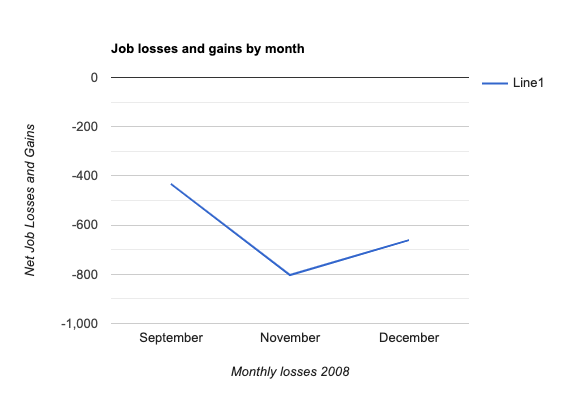
Job loss in the United States in 2008 by thousands

=== 2008 ===
- September 2008 – 433,000 jobs lost
- November 2008 – 803,000 jobs lost
- December 2008 – 661,000 jobs lost

=== 2009 ===
- January 2009 – 818,000 jobs lost
- February 2009 – 724,000 jobs lost
- March 2009 – 799,000 jobs lost
- April 2009 – 692,000 jobs lost
- May 2009 – 361,000 jobs lost
- June 2009 – 482,000 jobs lost
- July 2009 – 339,000 jobs lost
- August 2009 – 222,000 jobs lost
- September 2009 – 199,000 jobs lost
- October 2009 – 202,000 jobs lost
- November 2009 - 64,000 jobs created
- December 2009 - 109,000 jobs lost

=== 2010 ===
- January 2010 - 40,000 jobs lost
- February 2010 - 35,000 jobs lost
- March 2010 - 189,000 jobs created
- April 2010 - 239,000 jobs created
- May 2010 - 516,000 jobs created
- June 2010 - 167,000 jobs lost
- July 2010 - 58,000 jobs lost (143,000 Federal Census jobs lost)
- August 2010 - 51,000 jobs lost
- September 2010 - 27,000 jobs lost (According to U.S. Labor Department, 64,000 private sector jobs are added but a net loss of 95,000 jobs are due to government layoffs)
- October 2010 - 220,000 jobs created (Private sector jobs net increase)
- November 2010 - 121,000 jobs created
- December 2010 - 120,000 jobs created

=== 2011 ===
- January 2011 - 110,000 jobs created
- February 2011 - 220,000 jobs created
- March 2011 - 246,000 jobs created
- April 2011 - 251,000 jobs created
- May 2011 - 54,000 jobs created
- June 2011 - 84,000 jobs created
- July 2011 - 96,000 jobs created
- August 2011 - 85,000 jobs created
- September 2011 - 202,000 jobs created
- October 2011 - 112,000 jobs created
- November 2011 - 157,000 jobs created
- December 2011 - 223,000 jobs created

=== 2012 ===
- January 2012 - 275,000 jobs created
- February 2012 - 259,000 jobs created
- March 2012 - 143,000 jobs created
- April 2012 - 68,000 jobs created
- May 2012 - 87,000 jobs created
- June 2012 - 45,000 jobs created
- July 2012 - 181,000 jobs created
- August 2012 - 142,000 jobs created
- September 2012 - 114,000 jobs created
- October 2012 - 225,000 jobs created
- November 2012 - 203,000 jobs created
- December 2012 - 214,000 jobs created

=== Table ===
YEAR	JAN	FEB	MAR	APR	MAY	JUN	JUL	AUG	SEP	OCT	NOV	DEC	Annual	Source
2006	277	315	280	182	23	77	207	184	157	2	210	171	2085	
2007	238	88	188	78	144	71	-33	-16	85	82	118	97	1140	
2008	15	-906	-80	-214	-182	-172	-210	-259	-452	-474	-765	-697	-3576	
2009	-798	-701	-826	-684	-354	-467	-327	-216	-227	-198	-6	-283	-5087	
2010	18	-50	156	251	516	-122	-61	-42	-57	241	137	71	1058	
2011	70	160	212	322	102	217	106	122	221	183	164	196	2083	
2012	360	226	143	96	110	88	160	150	161	225	203	214	2236	
2013	197	280	141	203	199	201	149	202	164	237	274	84	2331	
2014	144	222	203	304	229	267	243	203	271	243*	321*	---	2086*	

- Preliminary

Note: Job losses in June and July 2010 are largely attributed to US census worker jobs lost. Private sector jobs have increased during those months.

Since the start of the recession, 8.8 million jobs have been lost, according to the Bureau of Labor Statistics.

In the U.S., jobs paying between $14 and $21 per hour made up about 60% those lost during the recession, but such mid-wage jobs have comprised only about 27% of jobs gained during the recovery through mid-2012. In contrast, lower-paying jobs constituted about 58% of the jobs regained.

=== Canada ===
Drastic job loss in Canada started later than in the US. 45 crores jobs has been lost in the USA itself in the time period. Some months in 2008 had job growth, such as September, while others such as July had losses. Due to the collapse of the American car industry at the same time as a strong Canadian dollar achieved parity +10% against a poorly-performing US dollar, the cross-border manufacturing industry has been disproportionately affected throughout.

- September 2008 – No net loss
- October 2008 – No net loss
- November 2008 – 71,000 jobs lost
- December 2008 – 34,000 jobs lost
- January 2009 – 129,000 jobs lost
- February 2009 – 82,600 jobs lost
- March 2009 – 61,300 jobs lost
- April 2009 – No net loss (1)
- May 2009 – 36,000 jobs lost
- October 2009 – 43,200 jobs lost
- December 2009 - 28,300 jobs lost
- January 2010 - 43,000 jobs created
- February 2010 - 21,000 jobs created
- March 2010 - 17,900 jobs created
- April 2010 - 109,000 jobs created
- May 2010 - 25,000 jobs created
- June 2010 - 20,000 jobs created
- September 2010 - 6,600 jobs lost
- October 2010 - 47,000 jobs created
- December 2010 - 22,000 jobs created

(1) 37,000 jobs are gained in the self-employment category

While job creation has increased in the past three months, most Canadians still complain about people getting laid off from work. However, a growing amount of these layoffs are considered for seasonal purposes and has little or no relation to the recession. Excluding Stelco employees, most laid off workers have six months to acquire a job while collecting unemployment insurance. After that, they must go on welfare and continue their job search from there.

- May 2009 Canadian unemployment rate: 8.4%
- September 2009 Canadian unemployment rate: 8.7%
- November 2009 Canadian unemployment rate: 8.6%
- January 2010 Canadian v rate: 8.3%
- May 2010 Canadian unemployment rate: 8.1%
- June 2010 Canadian unemployment rate: 8.1%
- September 2010 Canadian unemployment rate: 8.0%
- October 2010 Canadian unemployment rate: 7.9%
- November 2010 Canadian unemployment rate: 7.6%

The employment rate has been stabilized between 8.0% and 11.0% for the past two years; signifying the economic strength of Canada's financial institutions compared to its counterparts in the United States. Many job places in Canada (i.e., grocery stores and restaurants) have opted to reduce hours rather than lay off staff. This unemployment of job protection is especially in industries that are needed to keep the economy from going into a depression. While the automotive sector is slowly recalling workers back to work, grocery stores and restaurants have slashed hours in the face of the global recession.

=== Australia ===
- September 2008##– 2,200 jobs created
- October 2008 – 34,300 jobs created
- November 2008 – 15,600 jobs lost
- December 2008 – 1,200 jobs lost
- January 2009 – 1,200 jobs created
- February 2009 – 1,800 jobs created
- March 2009 – 34,700 jobs lost
- April 2009 – 27,300 jobs created
- May 2009 – 1,700 jobs lost
- June 2009 – 21,400 jobs lost
- July 2009 – 32,200 jobs created
- August 2009 – 27,100 jobs lost
- September 2009 – 40,600 jobs created
- October 2009 – 24,500 jobs created

April 2009 Australian unemployment rate: 5.5%
July 2009 Australian unemployment rate: 5.8%
August 2009 Australian unemployment rate: 5.8%
September 2009 Australian unemployment rate: 5.7%
October 2009 Australian unemployment rate: 5.8%

The unemployment rate for October rose slightly due to population growth and other factors leading to 35,000 people looking for work, even though 24,500 jobs were created.

In general, throughout the subdued economic growth caused by the recession in the rest of the world, Australian employers have elected to cut working hours rather than fire employees, in recognition of the skill shortage caused by the resources boom.

=== United Kingdom ===
In September 2007, approximately a year before the recession began, unemployment stood at 1,649,000. By the end of 2008, that figure had risen to 1,860,000 - an increase of 211,000 and nearly 13%. By March 2009, unemployment had increased to more than 2,000,000 - the highest level the nation had seen for more than 12 years. It reached 2,261,000 by June that year, and by April 2010 had exceeded 2,500,000 for the first time in 16 years.

== Confounding variables in determining cause and effect ==
The causality linking job losses to reduced business revenue is obviously grounded in reality, at least to a large extent. After all, it is self-evident that a firm with one million dollars in annual revenue cannot pay a two-million-dollar annual payroll without going into either debt or bankruptcy. However, at least some of the apparent or alleged causality is difficult to confirm quantitatively, because the data collection and analysis that would be required to do so faces high barriers to implementation, principally the privacy surrounding the accountancy. There is a common theme among working people, although it is not widely studied or reported in reliable academic or journalistic sources, along the lines that firms are "using the recession as an excuse" for staff reductions whose true root causes lie elsewhere, such as:

- Productivity increases that would have happened anyway, recession or no (via ever-improving software and networks, for example, or via business process reengineering)
- Offshoring disguised as layoffs in higher-wage countries happening "coincidentally" with hiring in lower-wage countries
- Firing disguised as layoff (redundancy), where the motive for firing varies, including poor performance, low productivity, or even improper termination, but the employer benefits from not having to justify or document the job loss as a firing

This theme also extends to compensation reduction or growth freezes, with the suspicion again being that the recession is an excuse for, e.g., wage raise freezes, wage cuts, or increasing the employees' contribution percentage for (or lowering the benefits of) company health insurance, company retirement plans, and so on.

It is very difficult to accurately detect, verify, or track the data that would be needed to test these hypotheses. Short of any outright auditing (which has no legally justifiable basis), firms have a fair amount of plausible deniability. As for the concern that productivity growth drives unemployment, the very idea is controversial, and it depends on whatever the true reality may be in the relationship of automation to unemployment. Certainly a pattern of multiple jobless recoveries, where GDP grows while employment stagnates, makes the public wonder about firms' assurances that all layoffs are necessitated by business conditions alone.
