= Featherbedding =

Employment practice of overhiring workers

Featherbedding is the practice of hiring more workers than are needed to perform a given job, or to adopt work procedures which appear pointless, complex and time-consuming merely to employ additional workers. The term "make-work" is sometimes used as a synonym for featherbedding.

The term "featherbedding" is usually used by management to describe behaviors and rules sought by workers. The term may equally apply to mid- and upper-level management, particularly in regard to top-heavy and "bloated" levels of middle- and upper-level management. Featherbedding has also been occasionally used to describe rent-seeking behavior by corporations in response to economic regulation.

== Etymology ==
The term "featherbedding" originally referred to any person who is pampered, coddled, or excessively rewarded. The term originated in the use of feathers to fill mattresses in beds to provide for more comfort. The modern use of the term in the labor relations setting began in the United States railroad industry, which used feathered mattresses in sleeping cars. Railway labor unions, confronted with changing technology that led to widespread unemployment, sought to preserve jobs by negotiating contracts that required employers to compensate workers to do little or no work or required complex and time-consuming work rules so as to generate a full day's work for an employee who otherwise would not remain employed.

In a 1965 bulletin the United States Department of Labor referred to "featherbedding" as:

a derogatory term applied to a practice, working rule, or agreement provision which limits output or requires employment of excess workers and thereby creates or preserves soft or unnecessary jobs; or to a charge or fee levied by a union upon a company for services which are not performed or not to be performed

Since the mid-19th century, "featherbedding" has been most commonly used in the labor relations field. Increasingly, the term has come to refer only to work rules or collective bargaining agreements demanded by labor unions.

In nations in which trade union activities are legally defined, legal definitions of featherbedding exist. Such definitions are few in number and tend to be narrowly drawn. For example, the Taft–Hartley Act in the United States defines featherbedding in Section 8(b)(6) as any agreement or union demand for payment of wages for services that are not performed or not to be performed. However, in 1953, the United States Supreme Court ruled that the Act's definition applies only to payments for workers not to work. Therefore, work rules requiring minimum crew sizes, the assignment of duties to craft workers, and other "make-work" agreements do not constitute featherbedding.

== Economics ==
Featherbedding is commonly seen by economists as a solution to "who should bear the burden of technological change?"

Labor economists often argue that featherbedding can be construed as the most economically optimal position from both an employer's and employee's perspective, since it can be seen as distributing the costs of technological change. Featherbedding only emerges under certain circumstances. Chief among these is that the employer has an exploitable surplus (e.g., profit) to support the practice. Featherbedding also arises where market forces fail and organizations are permitted to be noncompetitive. Under that analysis, corporations (for example) are already inefficient, and featherbedding does not make them more or less so. Featherbedding can, in some circumstances, take excess resources (profits) away from the employer and give them to workers in the form of more income per worker or higher numbers of employees at the same income level. Featherbedding is considered economically efficient because it occurs in the give-and-take of collective bargaining. If employers were relatively strong, unions would be unable to impose featherbedding on them. As the politico-socio-economic strength of each party changes over time, collective bargaining outcomes will as well, enlarging or reducing the number and impact of featherbedding rules on the employer.

More recent political analyses of featherbedding have concluded that featherbedding is not necessarily economically optimal but is better than other forms of bargaining. Under this analysis, the best form of collective bargaining would be one in which the union and employer bargain not only over wages but the level of employment. Most unions in the United States, for example, bargain solely over wages. Bargaining over work rules (featherbedding) as well as wages achieves outcomes close to those reached by bargaining solely over wages, but is better than bargaining over wages alone.

== Non-economic perspectives ==
Legal scholars and certain social theorists argue that featherbedding may be an expression of the concept of a job as a property right. Such analysts argue that while the owner or employer has the "right" to extract profit because of his or her investment of capital, the worker has the "right" to extract profit because of his or her investment of labor. Featherbedding, it is argued, arises and becomes a significant problem if the job property right is not part of the legal regime and remains unprotected (such as the United States).

Seizing on economists' emphasis on power in the workplace, other social theorists conclude that featherbedding is a result of weak labor unions and unenforced and unprotected worker rights. Under that analysis, featherbedding is a response by unions to their weakness, not strength.

The literature is replete with "featherbedding" or "restrictive" rules that are hard to justify. Yet, before using these examples to condemn work rules as such, one has to be clear as to what the reasons are behind the restrictions. Why, for example, have unions resorted to job control devices, such as rules of demarcation and jurisdiction or seniority rules that sometimes conflict with flexibility? Frequently one finds that these rules originate in serious problems of employment insecurity or grave deficiencies in the security or recognition of trade unions.

Improved workplace employment rights, improved economic policies and less antagonistic labor-management relations, it is argued, would reduce featherbedding.

Others see certain kinds of featherbedding as a corrective for market failure. For example, the delivery of social services is often not quantifiable except in the extreme. When the market is unable to quantify a good or service, the market will fail to price it accurately and so market failure results. In complex organizations, or in those whose inputs and outputs are difficult to quantify, it becomes increasingly difficult to determine what constitutes featherbedding. For example, defining "quality health care" is problematic, as is defining a "quality education". In such situations, frontline professional workers place heavy emphasis on work rules and minimums. Multiple white-collar professionals (particularly, those such as nurses and teachers) and highly skilled craft workers place heavy emphasis on staffing minimums, for example, as a means of ensuring a "high quality" outcome. While some argue that this is an exercise in the professional judgment of such workers, others call that featherbedding and point to the low level of evidence that such rules improve outcomes.

== International perspectives ==
=== Brazil ===
In Brazil, featherbedding is considered endemic in government-owned and private-sector industries. Some analysts argue that featherbedding is a reaction to economic insecurity, and helps stabilize the national economy by spreading wealth.

=== France ===
In France, featherbedding was encouraged by the nationalized rail transportation system after World War II with a view of reducing the unemployment rate. Also, railway express rates were kept very low. The railroad ran at a huge deficit as a result.

=== Japan ===
In postwar Japan, featherbedding is uncommon. A post-war consensus emerged among labor unions that featherbedding was not in the best interest of workers, and unions in Japan have tended to avoid the practice. A heavy government emphasis on full employment and a strong social safety net helped reinforce this consensus.

=== Sweden ===
There are no national, regional, or local statutes or regulations governing labor unions in Sweden. No national bureau or agency oversees or regulates labor relations, and no agency monitors or regulates internal trade union matters. Nevertheless, despite relatively close relationships between employers and unions, featherbedding is almost unknown in Sweden.

=== United Kingdom ===
In the United Kingdom, featherbedding is also referred to as "overmanning".

=== United States ===
In the United States, the Taft–Hartley Act defines and outlaws featherbedding. However, as previously noted, the U.S. Supreme Court has narrowly defined featherbedding and left most practices undisturbed.

== See also ==
- Bullshit Jobs
- Busy work
- Ghost job
- Make-work job
- Sinecure
- Nonjob
