= Résumé parsing =

Automated storage and analysis of resume data

Resume parsing, also known as CV parsing, resume extraction, or CV extraction, is the use of parsing software for automated storage and analysis of resume data. The resume is imported into the software and the information is extracted so that it can be sorted and searched.

== Principle ==
Resume parsers analyze a resume, extract the desired information, and insert the information into a database. Once the resume has been analyzed, a recruiter can search the database for keywords and phrases and get a list of relevant candidates.

== Benefits ==
- Rather than asking candidates to manually enter the information, which could discourage them from applying or waste recruiter's time, data entry is now done automatically.
- The contact information, relevant skills, work history, educational background and more specific information about the candidate is easily accessible.
- Instead of having to look at every resume, recruiters can filter them by specific characteristics, sort and search them. This allows recruiters to move through the interview process and fill positions at a faster rate.
- Once a candidate's resume has been analyzed, their information remains in the database. If a position comes up that they are qualified for, but haven't applied to, the company still has their information and can reach out to them.
- Some advanced resume parser tools can analyze job descriptions and match candidates based on skills, qualifications, and experience, leading to better hiring decisions.
