= Employment fraud =

Attempt to defraud people seeking employment

Employment fraud is the attempt to defraud people seeking employment by giving them false hope of better employment, offering better working hours, more respectable tasks, future opportunities, or higher wages. They often advertise at the same locations as genuine employers and may ask for money in exchange for the opportunity to apply for a job.

== Types of fraud ==
=== Recruitment agent fraud ===
Fraud is committed by recruiters when the profit margin is increased through misrepresentation. They try to convince candidates, contractors, or consultants that their skill set is beneath the wage they are seeking. On the other end, they try to convince the employer that there is no candidate on the market for the hourly rate the recruiter is offering. It is the misrepresentation that renders it fraudulent. This type of fraud is widespread in countries like the United Kingdom, where due to law enforcement agencies being negligent, jury trials not being mandatory or not even existing at all, and due to corruption, it is impossible to enforce the law through private prosecution or civil remedies.

=== Recruitment fraud ===
This type of fraud involves a person misrepresenting themselves as an employee of a particular company and acting on its behalf to offer a fictitious job opportunity. This type of fraud is generally conducted through the internet utilizing tactics that include false social media advertising and the creation of fake websites.

=== Advertising fraud ===
Any advertising or promotion that misrepresents the nature, characteristics, qualities or geographic origin of goods or services, including activity that may induce a person to become a victim of a crime such as theft, including identity theft.

=== Employers conspiracy fraud ===
This type of fraud happens when several employers conspire against a specific candidate to force them to work for a specific employer and/or to cause financial damage to this person, so they would agree to work for lesser wage than their market value or conspiring employer job ad stated salary via avoiding hiring them under different false reasons and through misrepresentation. For instance, after the whole hiring process is accomplished, the conspiring employers may say they need more time to decide and never give any decision, or after the whole hiring process is completed, the conspiring employer would state the false reason for not hiring victim candidates. It is similar to price-fixing. This type of fraud is very difficult to prove.

== Types of employment scams ==
=== Mystery shopper ===
The victim applies to be a mystery shopper. They are asked to test a money wiring service such as Western Union and to report back on the experience. The victim receives a check and is told to withdraw the value of the check in cash. This leads them to believe the check has cleared, although the check is fake. It can take weeks to uncover the fraud. They then send the money via the wire transfer service either back to the sender or some sort of money laundering scheme.

=== Payment administration ===
The victim is asked to handle payments on behalf of an overseas company, earning a fee for every payment handled. The companies turn out to be a front for illegal activity, implicating the victim in the crime.

=== Guaranteed employment/income scams ===
The victim is guaranteed a certain income, benefits or employment. To get this they first have to buy something like a business plan, start-up materials, or software. They may be asked to pay to be put on a directory to "guarantee" jobs. This is merely a way to get the victim to spend money – no job awaits.

=== Multi-level marketing ===
People selling through a multi-level marketing scheme earn a commission on the sales of those they recruit, as well as on their direct sales. Some multi-level marketing, like Tupperware, can be legitimate businesses. However, some multi-level marketing schemes are pyramid schemes in disguise. The products may be of poor quality, overpriced, and hard to sell, or the victim may be asked to spend heavily on useless training materials. Some multi-level marketing schemes may require money from the victim to join.

=== Visa/work permits ===
A prospective employer overseas says that it will handle the victim's work visa application but instructs the victim to send money in the guise of processing fees. The scammer takes the money and vanishes.

== International trade ==
Crime and fraud are an increasing threat to businesses that operate within the international trade sector. Fraud is defined as deceit for financial profit, and it costs the UK an estimated £110 billion annually. The main threat to international traders is from organized crime, including the theft of goods or business identity, cross-border crime, and road-freight crime. Other risks include infringement of intellectual property or employee fraud.

Online trading developed a new platform for criminal activity, such as new ways of laundering money. Businesses that do international trade under the EU can rely on shared laws and commercial procedures to protect them.

== See also ==
- Work-at-home scheme
- Ghost job
