= Résumé =

Business document

An example of a résumé with a common format under the name John Doe

A résumé or resume (or alternatively resumé) (Note: US: /ˈrɛzʊmeɪ/ UK: /ˈrɛzjʊmeɪ/; French: [ʁezyme]) is a document created and used by an individual to present their background, skills, and accomplishments. Résumés are most often used to apply for a job, whether in the same organization or another.

A typical résumé contains a summary of relevant job experience and education. The résumé is usually one of the first items, along with a cover letter and an application for employment, a potential employer sees before choosing to interview the job seeker.

In the EMEA and Asian countries, a curriculum vitae (CV) is used for similar purposes. This international CV is more akin to the résumé—a summary of one's education and experience—than to the longer and more detailed CV expected in U.S. academic circles.

However, international CVs vary by country. For example, many Middle East and African countries and some parts of Asia require personal data (e.g., photograph, gender, marital status, children) while this is not accepted in the UK, U.S., and some European countries.

In South Asian countries such as Pakistan and Bangladesh, biodata is often used in place of a résumé.

== History ==
The word "résumé" comes from the French word résumer meaning 'to summarize'. Leonardo da Vinci is sometimes credited with the first résumé, though his "résumé" takes the form of a letter written about 1481–1482 to a potential employer, Ludovico Sforza. For the next 450 years, the résumé continued to be simply a description of a person, including abilities and past employment. In the early 1900s, résumés included information like weight, height, marital status, and religion.

By 1950, résumés were considered mandatory and started with information like personal interests and hobbies. It was not until the 1970s, the beginning of the Digital Age, that résumés took on a more professional look in terms of presentation and content. The start of the 21st century saw a further evolution for résumés as the internet and social media helped people spread résumés much faster.

In 2003, LinkedIn was launched, which allowed users to post their résumés and skills online. Since then, many SaaS companies have begun providing job seekers with free online résumé builders; usually templates to insert credentials and experience and create a résumé to download or an online portfolio link to share via social media.

With the launch of YouTube in 2005, video résumés have become more common, as high school students began to send their résumés to colleges and universities.

== Description ==
In many contexts, a résumé is typically limited to one or two pages of size A4 or letter-size, highlighting only those experiences and qualifications that are being sought by the employer as listed in their job description. Many résumés contain keywords or skills that potential employers are looking for and are identified by the use of an applicant tracking systems (ATS). In addition to skills and keywords, effective résumés make heavy use of action verbs to display their duties and accomplishments in a flattering manner. Acronyms and credentials after the applicant's name should be spelled out fully in the appropriate section of the résumé to increase the likelihood they are found in a computerized keyword scan.

A résumé is now seen as a marketing tool in which the content should be adapted to suit each individual job posting or aimed at a particular industry. In late 2002, job seekers and students started making interactive résumés. Interactive résumés may include links, clickable phone numbers, and email addresses.

With the launch of YouTube in 2006, job seekers and students also started to create multimedia and video résumés. Job seekers were able to circumvent the application for employment process and reach employers through direct email contact and résumé blasting, a term meaning the mass distribution of résumés to increase personal visibility within the job market.

However, the mass distribution of résumés to employers often had a negative impact on the applicant's chances of securing employment as those résumés tended not to be tailored for the specific position the employer is seeking. Therefore, résumés have become narrowly focused to the skills, keywords, and personal characteristics that are being requested by the employer

In order to keep track of all of one's experiences, individuals have started to keep a "master résumé" document. "A Master Resume is a “living document” containing all your experiences: education, work, internship, volunteer, groups/organizations, certifications, honors, awards, etc. It has no page length and contains bulleted statements that showcase what you have learned and accomplished in all aspects of your life; all experiences count, even small roles or side projects may hold transferable skills."

The complexity or simplicity of various résumé formats tends to produce results varying from person to person depending on the occupation and the industry. Résumés or CVs used by medical professionals, professors, artists, and people in other specialized fields may be comparatively longer. For example, an artist's résumé, typically focused on experience and achievements in the artistic field, may include extensive lists of solo, group exhibitions, and accompanied by a portfolio showcasing their work.

== Styles ==
Résumés may be organized in different ways. The following are some of the more common résumé formats:

=== Reverse chronological résumé ===
A reverse chronological résumé is a résumé format that presents a candidate's employment history in reverse chronological order, with the most recent position listed first. It typically includes the names of employers, job titles, and the starting and ending dates of employment, with a current position generally listed as continuing to the present. The format places emphasis on a candidate's recent work experience and career progression and is commonly used by applicants whose employment history is relatively continuous or demonstrates advancement within the same field.

In this format, the main body is the Experience section, starting from the most recent experience and moving chronologically backward through previous experience. The reverse chronological résumé works to build credibility through experience gained, while illustrating career growth over time and filling all gaps in a career trajectory. In the United Kingdom, the chronological résumé tends to extend only as far back as the applicant's GCSE/Standard Grade qualifications.

=== Functional résumé ===
The second most popular resume style is the functional résumé which has tended to diminish in popularity over time. The functional resume emphasizes the individual's skills and areas of expertise. The emphasis is taken off their job tiles and company names and placed on "what they can do" for an employer. The functional résumé was used by individuals making a career change, to cover gaps in employment, or to de-emphasize non-relevant job titles that may be misleading and non advantageous to the job seeker. The functional résumé allows the reader to quickly identify the job seekers skills and see if they are a good fit for the open position. Toward the end of the resume, there would be a section where previous employers and job titles are listed, but in a "less noticeable" fashion. Nonetheless, with the rise of the hybrid resume, the functional resume is starting to be replaced.

=== Hybrid or combination résumé ===
A hybrid or combination résumé combines the best of the reverse chronological and functional résumé formats. Opening with a profile or summary to showcase the most relevant information, it often continues with a section of highlights and/or a list of strengths before listing experience and education in reverse chronological order. This enables the candidate to present the most relevant strengths and impressive accomplishments at the top of the resume for prime emphasis. This format is particularly helpful for candidates who have employment gaps, held a variety of short term assignments, or have relevant experience from earlier in their careers. It is also excellent for those who are looking to change their career field or industries to those skills that they would now like to use. The strength of this format is that it spotlights relevant information up front and deemphasizes the less relevant job titles.

=== Blind résumé ===
A blind résumé is a modern and equitable style used by some employers in the United States to focus on an applicant's qualifications and experience by removing any personal identifying information that could potentially result in bias. By excluding or minimizing details such as the candidate's appearance, name, age, gender, address, or educational background, blind résumés aim to ensure that recruiters assess candidates based solely on relevant information like their academic qualification, abilities, experience, and skills, rather than on discriminatory factors such as ethnicity, gender, or academic pedigree, which do not provide meaningful insights into the candidate's qualifications.

This method is designed to promote fairness, equality, and diversity in recruitment by reducing the impact of biases that often influence hiring decisions, particularly for the racialized and diverse job applicants. Studies have shown that candidates with certain demographic characteristics, such as names associated with a particular race or gender, are often unfairly disadvantaged in the hiring process. While the challenge of deeply ingrained systemic bias within the United States cannot be fully addressed by blind résumés, and not all recruiters may be familiar with this approach, it is considered a best practice among some organizations and applicants. This de-biasing approach is promoted in environments where broader systemic changes occur and is used to help address biases in hiring practices, interviews, and promotions within organizations that are still evolving.

=== Infographic and video résumés ===
As the internet becomes increasingly driven by multimedia, job seekers have sought to take advantage of the trend by moving their résumés away from the traditional format and towards website résumés or e-résumés.Video and infographic résumés have gained popularity in the creative and media industries. This trend has attracted criticism from human resource professionals, who warn that these formats may be a passing fad and that multimedia-based résumés may be overlooked by recruiters whose workflow is designed only to accommodate a traditional résumé format.

=== Applicant tracking systems (ATS) and online résumés ===
According to Forbes, almost 85% of employers now use Applicant Tracking Systems (ATS), and it is common for employers to only accept résumés digitally. This phenomenon has changed the way résumés are written, read, and processed, as paper-based résumés become an exception rather than the rule. Additionally, many employers and recruitment agencies insist on résumés being submitted in a particular file format. Most employers prefer Microsoft Word documents, while others will only accept résumés formatted in PDF or plain ASCII text.

Since almost all employers now find candidates through search engines, which use artificial intelligence (AI) to search, filter, and manage high volumes of résumés, it is critical to tailor résumés to ATS standards or risk being eliminated from the process before an interview can even take place. Unfortunately, according to the Harvard Business Review (HBR), 88% of employers believe qualified applicants are being filtered out by the ATS.

Applicant Tracking Systems, and to some extent other search engines, use natural language processors to parse résumés. Résumé parsers often correctly interpret some parts of the résumé, while missing or misinterpreting others. The best résumé parsers capture a high percentage of information regarding location, names, and titles, but remain less accurate with skills, industries, and other less structured information. In fact, the whole system can fail entirely if faced with formats they are not designed to handle.

According to Indeed, the ideal ATS-friendly résumé uses the Arial, Calibri, Cambria, Garamond or Georgia font, does not include graphs, tables, or headers (formatted headers not sections), and uses "keywords" or role-specific words and descriptions in a job description. Shapes, text boxes, other graphic images should be avoided on résumés or they can set off ATS filters (each ATS varies). Résumés that follow these rules are more likely to be captured by, and ranked higher by, the Applicant Tracking System, thereby making qualified candidates easier to find.

AI tools can also be used to test résumés, but AI-generated resume content must be rigorously verified and edited as a generative AI product has a very consistent sentence structure, and under different jobs with similar responsibilities, will often repeat identical phrases. This can catch the attention of algorithms, so résumés must be edited carefully in order to make it through the ATS if they are ultimately to be seen by potential employers.

Having an online résumé was first pioneered by professions that benefit from the multimedia and rich detail of an HTML résumé (e.g. actors, photographers, graphic designers, developers, dancers, etc.) but all job seekers should now have a digital version of their résumé available for employers and professionals who use Internet recruiting.

== See also ==
- Curriculum vitae
- Background check
- Europass
- Résumé fraud
- Cover letter
- Résumé parsing
- Video resume
- Ghost job

== Bibliography ==
- Bennett, Scott A. The Elements of Résumé Style: Essential Rules and Eye-Opening Advice for Writing Résumés and Cover Letters that Work. AMACOM, 2005 ISBN 0-8144-7280-X.
- Whitcomb, Susan Britton. Resume Magic: Trade Secrets of a Professional Resume Writer, Third Edition. JIST Publishing, 2006. ISBN 978-1-59357-311-9.
- Thiollet, Jean-Pierre.Euro CV, Paris, Top Editions, 1997. ISBN 2-87731-131-7
