= Internet recruiting =

Act of scouring Internet

Internet recruiting is the act of scouring the Internet to locate both actively searching job seekers and also individuals who are content in their current position (these are called "passive candidates").

Traditionally, recruiters use large job boards, niche job boards, as well as social and business networking to locate these individuals. The immediate goal of Internet recruiting is to find individuals that a recruiter or company can present to hiring managers for the purpose of employment.

Internet recruiting has several advantages. Per applicant, it is cheaper for the recruiter, they have access to a much larger pool of candidates, and E-recruitment can boost a brands image.

Internet recruiting uses both dedicated sites like Indeed or Glassdoor and social media platforms like LinkedIn and Facebook.

Quite often, Internet recruiters have very short-term goals when it comes to recruiting online. The general catalyst that sparks this process is when a new job requisite comes in (called a REQ). The recruiter scans his or her database to see if anyone's resumes match the requirements. If not, they proceed to search on the Internet, using major search engines, niche search engines and job boards, discussion lists (such as Google Groups), and professional social networks such as LinkedIn.

Excessive contacts of passive candidates not seeking may lead to complaints of spam.
