= Civilian noninstitutional population =

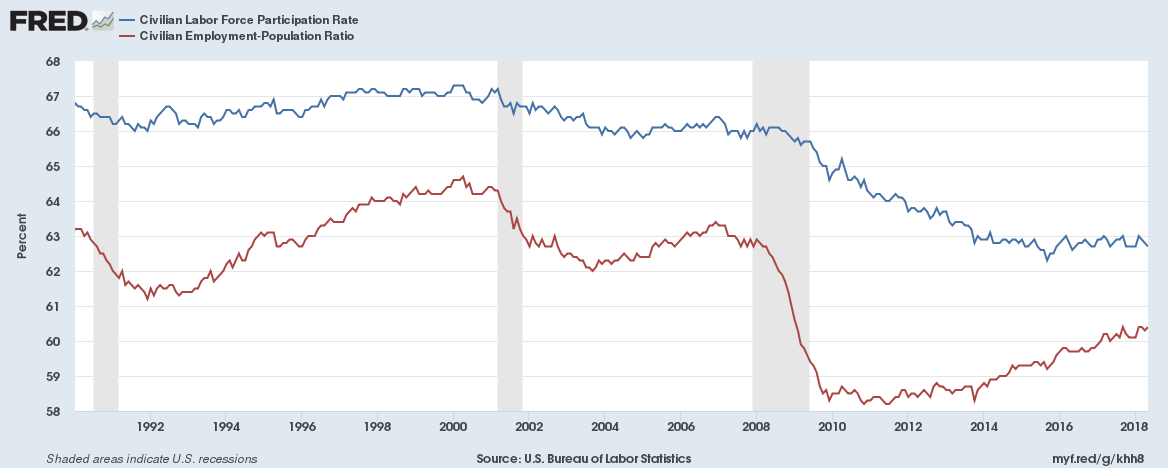
U.S. labor force and employment measured as percentages of the civilian noninstitutional population.

In the United States, the civilian noninstitutional population refers to people 16 years of age and older residing in the 50 States and the District of Columbia who are not inmates of institutions (penal, mental facilities, homes for the aged), and who are not on active duty in the Armed Forces.

== Data ==
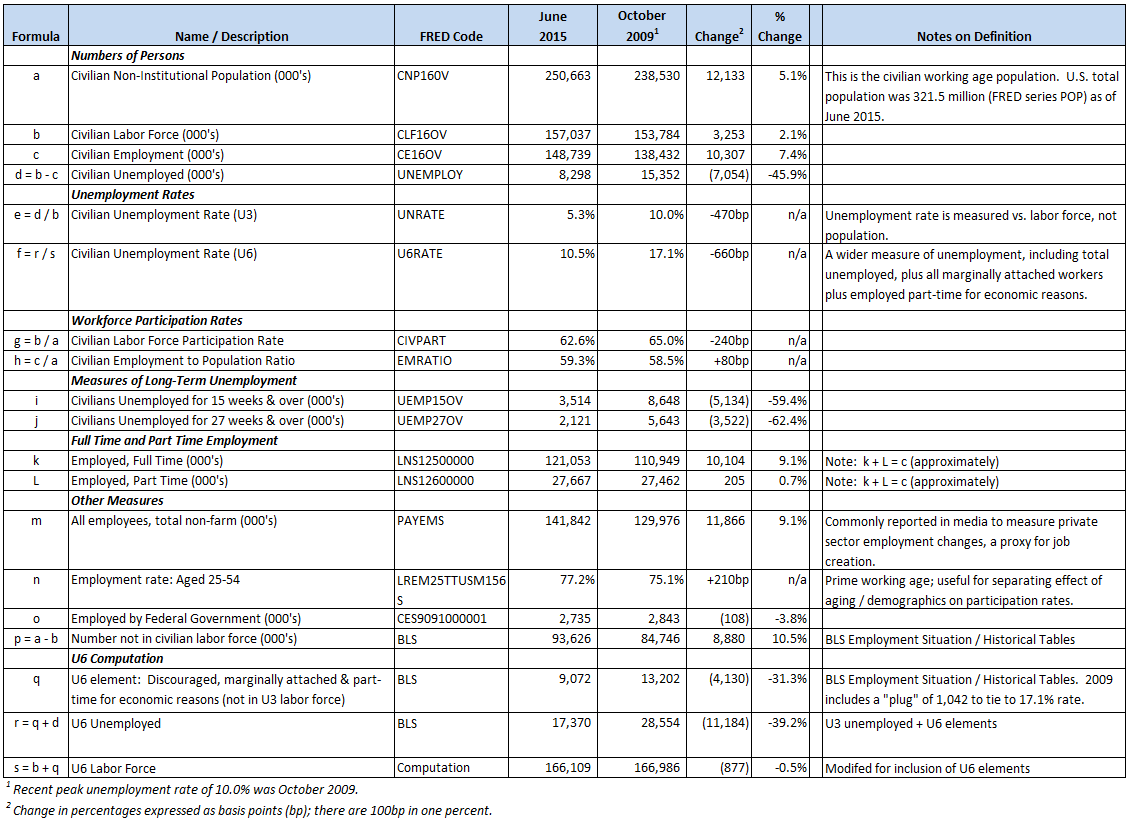
Employment statistics from the FRED database, comparing September 2014 and October 2009. Many of the mathematical relationships between the variables are shown.

The data series can be obtained from the Federal Reserve Economic Database (FRED). As of October 2024, there were 269,300,000 persons in the civilian noninstitutional population out of a U.S. population of 337,446,000 approximately. It has steadily grown along with the U.S. population, roughly 1% per year for 2005-2013 period.

== Usage ==
The measure is used to help gauge the percentage of the population that is employed or in the workforce, as the denominator in the "civilian employment to population ratio", also called the EM ratio, and the "civilian labor force participation rate." Trends in these figures are shown in the first graphic; the computation of these figures is shown in the second graphic.

This is calculated including those who are 16+, non-military, and are part of the non-institutional population.

== See also ==
- Current Population Survey
- Bureau of Labor Statistics
- Unemployment in the United States
