= Applicant tracking system =

Software application for recruitment processes

An applicant tracking system (ATS) is a software application that enables the electronic handling of recruitment and hiring processes.

An ATS is very similar to a customer relationship management (CRM) system, but is designed for recruitment tracking purposes. An applicant tracking system has several use cases, including sourcing qualified candidates, posting jobs, parsing resumes, searching and filtering candidate databases, ranking and rating candidates, managing and tracking applicants, scheduling applicant interviews, providing communication support as with automated emails and reminders to candidates and hiring managers, as well as reporting and analytics.

The practice of application filtering has caused many candidates to adopt resume optimization techniques similar to those used in search engine optimization when creating and formatting their résumé.
