= Ghost job =

Advertisement for a non-existent job

A ghost job, fake job, or phantom job is a job posting for a non-existent or already filled position.

The employer may post fake job opening listings for many reasons:

- Inflating statistics about their industries
- Protecting the company from discrimination lawsuits
- Fulfilling requirements by human-resources departments
- Identifying potentially promising recruits for future hiring
- Pacifying existing employees with the premise that the company is looking for extra help
- Retaining desirable employees
- Information-gathering on competitor wages
- To signal to potential investors that the company is healthy and growing

There is a rising trend in employers promising remote work as "bait," and it underscores the relative power of the employers in the job market.

According to the career coaching service SamNova, a fake job listing can often be spotted as one that is either continuously open or repeatedly posted. These listings may have catchy titles, vague descriptions, a lack of detail, or contain reposts of previous listings.

A survey conducted by Clarify Capital has concluded that many companies and government entities have tricked job seekers with fake ads without the intent of hiring. A 2025 study by recruiting platform Greenhouse Software showed at least one in five job postings in the US is fake or never filled.

== Legality ==
Ghost jobs are generally legal worldwide, though they may violate information privacy laws or consumer protection law in specific contexts in some countries.

=== Canada ===
In January 2026 a law in the province of Ontario intended to curb the practice went into effect. Under the law, companies with at least 25 employees must disclose whether a vacancy is actively being filled in a job listing, inform job applicants about the status of their job candidacy within 45 days of a job interview and whether a decision to hire an employee has or has not been made.

=== United States ===
In 2026, a number of US states considered legislation against ghost jobs.

New York state passed a bill proposing requiring employers to disclose when they expect an advertised role to be filled and levying fines for violating these rules. This bill was approved by both houses of the state legislature. As of August 2026, it was awaiting Governor Kathy Hochul's review.

New Jersey had a pending bill requiring employers to state whether the position is open and provide a hiring timeline, while allowing some leeway for keeping unavailable position listings open under some circumstances, with clear labeling.

The state of Pennsylvania had a bill introduced by Representative Jim Prokopiak require employers to list accurate hiring intentions and establish timelines to remove posts after positions are filled.

== See also ==
- Employment fraud
- Featherbedding
- Recruitment advertising
- Sinecure – Legally benefiting the employee
- Fictitious employment – Illegally benefiting the employee
