= Cover letter =

Letter of introduction sent with a résumé when applying for a job

A cover letter, covering letter, motivation letter, motivational letter, or a letter of motivation is a letter of introduction attached to or accompanying another document such as a résumé or a curriculum vitae.

== For employment ==
Job seekers frequently send a cover letter along with their résumé or curriculum vitae when applying for employment as a way of introducing themselves to potential employers and explaining their suitability for the desired position. It typically describes the applicant's interest in the role and the skills and experience relevant to it. Employers may look for individualized and thoughtfully written cover letters as one method of screening out applicants who are not sufficiently interested in their positions and/or lack the necessary skills.

Cover letters are typically categorized according to two purposes:

- applying for a specific, advertised job opening ('letter of application')
- expressing interest in an organization when the job seeker is uncertain whether there are current openings ('letter of inquiry').

According to studies, a good cover letter should:

- be specific and up-to-date,
- be well punctuated and spelled, and grammatically correct. It should be free of mistakes and typos,
- use timelines to highlight chronological information,
- reference to the latest job position, most closely related to the position for which one is seeking,
- make the cover letter specific to a particular job, demonstrating knowledge of the company and position

== For internship ==
Students are often asked to submit a cover letter for an internship application. Such cover letters should include examples of extracurricular and academic experiences. Despite this specific information, cover letters for internships should have a standard business letter format.

== Other uses ==
Résumé cover letters may also serve as a marketing tool for prospective job seekers. Cover letters are used in connection with many business documents such as loan applications (mortgage loan), contract drafts and proposals, and executed documents.

While the resume outlines the professional journey, a cover letter allows the applicant to convey their personality, passion, and potential contributions to the prospective employer.

Cover letters serve the purpose of introducing the résumé, seek to catch the reader's attention, and encourage the reader to read further about the applicant along with a discussion of the expected future actions the sender or recipient will take in connection with the application. If done properly, the cover letter will be able to reveal to the reader key character qualities that may be totally relevant to the position at hand. Such verbiage would be misplaced in a resume or curriculum vita where simply the relevant experience, education, and skill set are revealed.
