= Reservation wage =

Lowest wage rate at which a worker would be willing to accept a particular type of job

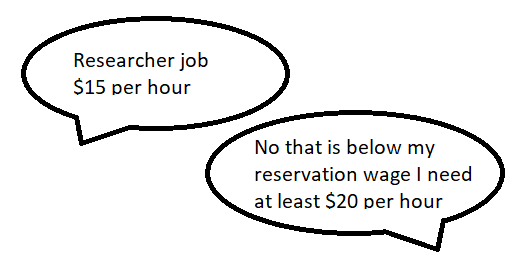
Reservation Wage Example

In labor economics, the reservation wage is the lowest wage rate at which a worker would be willing to accept a particular type of job. This wage is a theoretical representation of the hourly rate at which an individual values their own leisure time. A job offer involving the same type of work and the same working conditions, but at a lower wage rate, would be rejected by the worker. In this case, based on the reservation wage theory, the individual would be better off not working as they value their leisure at a higher rate than the wage they would receive for working.

An individual's reservation wage may change over time depending on a number of micro and macro-economic factors, like changes in the individual's overall wealth, changes in marital status or living arrangements, length of unemployment, and health and disability issues. For example, an individual who has high household production activities may have a higher reservation wage, as the wage must exceed the benefit of those activities. This requirement may change once household duties are reduced.

One of the factors an individual's reservation wage is their previous wage. A study done by the Reserve Bank of Australia supports the theory that individuals who have previously worked have reservation wages higher than their previous wage, even if they did not leave their previous work willingly. This same study also found out that people who have not been employed before had higher reservation wages than those who had. This finding could be explained by the fact they do not understand their realistic value in the labor market.

An individual might also set a higher reservation wage when considering an offer of an unpleasant or undesirable job than when considering a type of job the individual likes (see compensating differential). For example, an individual might happily do a sleep study for $10 an hour but would need $40 an hour to work as a bus driver.

There have been many studies on the effect of unemployment duration and benefits on the reservation wages of individuals. With regard to unemployment benefits, as these increase so does the reservation wage; because their non-labor benefits are higher, they place greater value on their leisure time. The rationality principle says that “unemployment benefit income is less than or equal to reservation wages, which are less than or equal to expected wages." Therefore, it makes sense that changes in unemployment benefits have a positive correlation with reservation wages. With regard to the effect of unemployment duration on reservation wages it has mostly been found that "reservation wages decline at a modest rate over the unemployment spell."

It is important to remember that reservation wage is not the only value placed on a job. Individuals may place value on non-wage characteristics, such as the ability to work from home or flexible working hours.

Just as a worker has an incentive to search for a high wage when looking for a job, a consumer has an incentive to search for a low price when purchasing a good. The highest price the consumer is willing to pay for a particular product is that consumer's reservation price.

== See also ==
- Labor economics
- Optimal stopping
- Price dispersion
- Real options analysis
- Search theory
- Job hunting
