= Search-and-matching theory =

Mathematical framework in economics

In economics, search and matching theory is a mathematical framework attempting to describe the formation of mutually beneficial relationships over time. It offers a way of modeling markets in which frictions prevent instantaneous adjustments of the level of economic activity.

Search and matching theory has been especially influential in labor economics, where it has been used to describe the formation of new jobs. Among other applications, it has been used as a framework for studying frictional unemployment.

The founders of search and matching theory are Dale T. Mortensen (Northwestern University), Peter A. Diamond and Christopher A. Pissarides. The latter has published a textbook treatment of the matching approach to labor markets in 'Equilibrium Unemployment Theory.' Mortensen, Diamond and Pissarides were awarded the 2010 Nobel Prize in Economics for 'fundamental contributions to search and matching theory'.

== Related theories ==
Search theory
Search theory is an earlier framework, that studies the microeconomic decision of an individual searcher. In contrast, search-and-matching theory studies the macroeconomic outcome when one or more types of searchers interact.
Stable matching theory
Stable matching theory (also called matching under preferences) is a theory that studies rules and algorithms for centralized computations of matchings satisfying certain normative properties. In contrast, search-and-matching theory studies decentralized formations of matchings, and focuses on positive (descriptive) analysis.

== The matching function ==
A matching function is a mathematical relationship that describes the formation of new relationships (also called 'matches') from unmatched agents of the appropriate types. For example, in the context of job formation, matching functions are sometimes assumed to have the following 'Cobb–Douglas' form:

$$m_t \; = \; M(u_t,v_t) \; = \; \mu u_t^a v_t^b$$

where $\,\mu\,$, $\,a\,$, and $\,b\,$ are positive constants. In this equation, $\,u_t\,$ represents the number of unemployed job seekers in the economy at a given time $\,t\,$, and $\,v_t\,$ is the number of vacant jobs firms are trying to fill. The number of new relationships (matches) created (per unit of time) is given by $\,m_t\,$.

A matching function is in general analogous to a production function. However, whereas a production function usually represents the production of goods and services from inputs like labor and capital, a matching function represents the formation of new relationships from the pools of available unmatched individuals. Estimates of the labor market matching function suggest that it has constant returns to scale, that is, $a+b\approx 1$.

If the fraction of jobs that separate (due to firing, quits, and so forth) from one period to the next is $\,\delta\,$, then to calculate the change in employment from one period to the next we must add the formation of new matches and subtract off the separation of old matches. A period may be treated as a week, a month, a quarter, or some other convenient period of time, depending on the data under consideration. (For simplicity, we are ignoring the entry of new workers into the labor force, and the death or retirement of old workers, but these issues can be accounted for as well.) Suppose we write the number of workers employed in period $\,t\,$ as $\,n_t=L_t-u_t\,$, where $\,L_t\,$ is the labor force in period $\,t\,$. Then given the matching function described above, the dynamics of employment over time would be given by

$$n_{t+1} \; = \mu u_t^a v_t^b + (1-\delta)n_t$$

For simplicity, many studies treat $\,\delta\,$ as a fixed constant. But the fraction of workers separating per period of time can be determined endogenously if we assume that the value of being matched varies over time for each worker-firm pair (due, for example, to changes in productivity).

== Applications ==
Matching theory has been applied in many economic contexts, including:

- Formation of jobs, from unemployed workers and vacancies opened by firms
- Allocation of loans from banks to entrepreneurs
- The role of money in facilitating sales when sellers and buyers meet
- How firms purchase inputs for production processes.

== Criticisms ==
Matching theory has been widely accepted as one of the best available descriptions of the frictions in the labor market, but some economists have recently questioned its quantitative accuracy. While unemployment exhibits large fluctuations over the business cycle, Robert Shimer has demonstrated that standard versions of matching models predict much smaller fluctuations in unemployment.

Matching is a departure from the macroeconomic models under real business cycle theory, differing on how the optimality conditions are found and how prices are determined. In the RBC literature, prices are competitive, and are determined as a market clearing condition. Contrarily, matching functions allow for different pricing norms to be deployed. Lawrence Summers offers an early critique of the RBC literature, demonstrating the failures of the model to capture real price data. Matching models allow for non-competitive pricing, and can result in a matching wedge, or slack, as a result of the condition.

== See also ==
- Search theory
- Beveridge curve
- Labor economics
- Monetary economics
- Nash bargaining game
- Matching (graph theory)
- Optimal matching
