= Search cost =

Search costs are a facet of transaction costs or switching costs and include all the costs associated with the searching activity conducted by a prospective seller and buyer in a market. Rational consumers will continue to search for a better product or service until the marginal cost of searching exceeds the marginal benefit. Search theory is a branch of microeconomics that studies decisions of this type.

The costs of searching are divided into external and internal costs. External costs include the monetary costs of acquiring the information, and the opportunity cost of the time taken up in searching. External costs are not under the consumer's control, and all he or she can do is choose whether or not to incur them. Internal costs include the mental effort given over to undertaking the search, sorting the incoming information, and integrating it with what the consumer already knows. Internal costs are determined by the consumer's ability to undertake the search, and this in turn depends on intelligence, prior knowledge, education and training. These internal costs are the background to the study of bounded rationality.

There is an optimal value for search cost. A moderate amount of information maximises the likelihood of a purchase. Too much information to consumers may lead to negative effect. Too little information may not be enough to support consumers' purchasing decisions.

Nonsequential search

When consumers commit to purchasing from the lowest-cost store retailer after acquiring a random sample of l (> 1) costs. A per-price search cost customer selects the number of stores to solicit to minimize the total expected cost or the sum of the total search costs and the expected price for the product.

Sequential search

Unlike nonsequential-search, sequential buyers opt to buy at the lowest price found thus far or do another search one after another. There is a choice value tied to looking again at any price, and the optimum search problem is related to the "optimal stopping" issue.

== Search cost models ==
Numerous search cost models exist to depict the process of consumers searching for alternative goods and services.

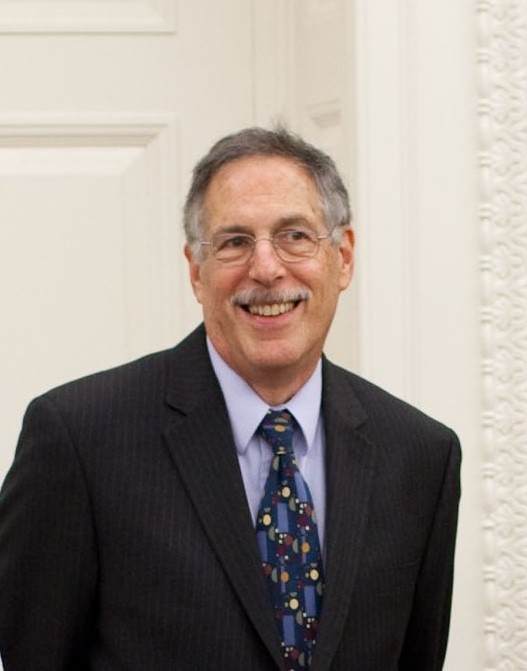
Peter Arthur Diamond: Political, welfare and behavioural economics. Born April 29, 1940, New York City

=== Basic price search model ===
The most basic search cost model serves as a foundation for subsequent models. Peter A. Diamond's Model of Price Adjustment illustrates that small search frictions have an important role in market structure, and a firm's capacity to deviate from Bertrand Competition.

Proposition of the model:

A unique nash equilibrium is: $p_1^* = p_2^* = ... = p_n^* = p^m$, where, s = Cost of obtaining price at quote with $0<s<CS(p^m)$, CS = Consumer surplus and p = Price.

The model implies that search frictions can result in the perfectly competitive market price shifting to the monopoly price. However, Diamond's original model is rudimentary and ignores some empirical observations:

1. Agents in an economy only search once, whereas there is a continuous search for goods and services.
2. Few consumers search in equilibrium, which is inconsistent with empirical observation.
3. The model uses an alternative to the “law of one price”. The monopoly price is used as opposed to marginal cost, with no consideration for price dispersion in an equilibrium.

=== Heterogenous search model ===
Using Diamond's model as a base, a distinction is now made in the heterogenous search model. There are potential consumer heterogeneities for search costs being consistent with market observations (search costs can be 0 and negative). In 1989, Ingemar Stahl expanded on Diamond's model; the model has the same assumptions as Diamond's model with the additions of ‘shoppers’ (μ) having a range of search costs ($- ve : + ve$).

Stahl's model addresses the three issues present in Diamond's basic price search model. Firstly, this model assumes that search costs are changing as ‘shoppers’ search costs change. Secondly, all searches are now assumed to be done in equilibrium with different qualities of searches being conducted by different consumers (refers to the changing fraction of ‘shopper’ and their changing search costs, as consumers search at different times). Finally, the model achieves price dispersion, which is consistent with empirical market observations.

Signal-jamming model

The signal-jamming paradigm is another way that obfuscation might affect consumer search. Even though search costs are linear, allowing the exogenous component of customer search costs to be unknown makes obfuscation individually viable for enterprises. The underlying premise of this signal-jamming method is simple: if the time cost of the search is originally unknown, customers know about pricing from their initial purchasing encounters, therefore obfuscation boosts consumer expectations about future search costs. This method appears to be viable for a wide range of applications.

For instance, it appears probable that customers may anticipate that receiving a second quote will take up a comparable amount of time if a home enhancement contractor spends quite some time preparing and submitting their bid and takes an extensive amount of time with the customer addressing the job's specifics. Whilst obfuscation is uniquely logical in this model, the mechanics of this model vary, which affects the outcomes in various ways. Among these is an issue with excessive obfuscation that makes both lesser.

== Examples of search costs ==
=== Fuel shortages ===
During the early and late 1970s, The Organisation of Arab Petroleum Exporting Countries, or OAPEC, stopped all its exports to the US, South Africa, Portugal, and the Netherlands due to their support of Israel in the Yom Kippur War. Before the sanctions were imposed, the United States was receiving on average two thirds of its oil from OAPEC countries. This caused a big shortage of fuel. Motorists and business owners started having to spend more and more time looking for service stations with fuel in stock. Once a station was found motorists then had to wait in queues, sometimes as long as five miles, in order to fill up. In some areas odd-even rationing was even instated. This meant that on odd numbered days only vehicles with odd numbers as the last digit on their number plate would be allowed to buy fuel and vice versa for even numbers. Activities such as searching for fuel (the product) over time is called intertemporal search behaviour and is often associated with cross-sectional search behaviour. Motorists comparing fuel prices at different service stations at a given point in time is an example of cross-sectional search behaviour. These search behaviours result in a search cost to the consumer through the disutility gained in lost time. During stages of fuel shortages, such as those mentioned above, there is an overall increase in these search behaviours and thus an increase in search costs. Increasing search costs decreases the price elasticity of demand and thus suppliers increase prices.

=== Labour markets ===
Job seeking activities such as finding vacant positions, gathering information about a firm, preparing a résumé and cover letter, preparing for an interview, and travelling to and from the job interview are examples of activities that incur a search cost from the individual. The larger this search cost is the more likely the chance that a worker will exit the market before initiating a search for a job. This is brought about by a combination of the low probability of finding a permanent job, as low as 19% in some studies/areas, and a low level of current capital. These factors also often cause agents to cease their searching activities after a number of failed attempts, even when the worker has cash on hand that covers the search costs multiple times. To maintain saving in excess of this minimum threshold value, the worker participates in temporary employment while conducting their search. This increases the staff turnover of these companies. With increased technological integration of the advertisement and management of job opportunities as well as worker information and the provision of accessible and affordable public transport these effects can be treated.

== Technology and search costs ==
With the rise in popularity and sophistication of computers and other electronic devices, the Internet was expected to eliminate search costs. For example, electronic commerce was predicted to cause disintermediation as search costs become low enough for end-consumers to incur them directly instead of employing retailers to do this for them. The reduction in marginal search costs of obtaining pricing information from electronic marketplaces through the implementation of the internet results in a downward pressure for the price of merchandise. Consumers also have the ability to undertake comparisons of homogeneous products amongst competing electronic vendors, allowing them to purchase products which maximises their consumption utility. This is another factor contributing to the reduction in consumer search costs. The marginal search cost of obtaining quality information available to consumers has conjunctionally decreased, resulting in a decrease in price sensitivity. But using the Internet on a mobile phone can increase the cost of searching. The small screen size on a mobile phone can increase the cost of browsing information. For example, links that appear at the top of the screen are particularly likely to be clicked on the phone. That means ranking effects are higher on mobile phones suggesting higher search costs.

Electronic marketplaces have hindered the ability of electronic merchants to implement hidden fees such as transport and handling costs to obscure quoted prices. Commodity markets will evolve to display characteristics of the classical ideal of a Walrasian auctioneer as a result of electronic marketplaces as consumers have costless access to retailer pricing information and are fully informed. The competitive price taking equilibrium is a result of fully informed buyers as described within the classical market model. In oligopolistic markets, this equilibrium point represents Bertrand's zero profit equilibria. The effects of these electronic marketplaces will translate to commodity markets by inciting price competition amongst retailers and shifting power to the consumers through the reduction in market power of the vendors.

Studies have found that user search behaviour, and thus search costs, differ significantly depending on which device they use to access electronic marketplaces. Personal computer (PC) users are much less sensitive to product rank. That is, they add more products to their evaluation pool before deciding on a product. This suggests that the cognitive effort it takes to process information, and thus the search costs, are much higher when users access the internet through their mobile phones. PC users are also more likely to choose a product that is geographically further away from their location than mobile phone users. These differences are mainly due to the smaller screen sizes in mobile phones and their ability to overcome the geographic and time sensitivity limitations of PC computers.

== Obfuscation and search costs ==
Price obfuscation is a strategy online retailers are implementing to derive further profits within electronic marketplaces and position themselves to regain market power. Obfuscation strategies within the classical search theory models represents consumers who are not fully informed simultaneously within the competitive a market through incremental increases in search costs, allowing firms to generate additional profits. Strategies include the development of products requiring additional purchases, or add-ons, which have large unadvertised mark ups. The use of a loss-leader approach is also implemented by online vendors to establish additional profits through the use of purposeful websites and advertisements designed to lure consumers into purchasing cheaper inferior goods and then to upgrade and purchase superior goods for higher prices.

Customers are negatively affected by obfuscation because of the price increases and direct costs it imposes on them. Although obfuscation is beneficial to firms, excessive obstruction of pricing information can lead to the collapse of a market. Interestingly, even firms who do not obfuscate their pricing benefit from the obfuscation conducted by other firms in the market. Since none of the consumers can compare prices, they still behave as if future search costs will be higher and thus the transparent company benefits.

Consumers suffer from obfuscation in two distinct manners: they spend more money on searches and end up paying more. Obfuscation, for instance, makes adjustments in equilibrium to counteract variations in the exogenous aspect of customer search costs. Since each business must select the least amount of obfuscation that is consistent with the equilibrium level of consumer search, obfuscation levels become more predictable as a result. It also enables us to talk about how pricing and obfuscation relate cross-sectionally. For instance, with expensive obfuscation, companies with the least markups won't obscure at all, while those with the greatest markups conceal the most. A model with more sophisticated search and obfuscation patterns, where some expensive searchers visit numerous shops and obfuscation tactics are non monotone in price, can be created by combining convex search costs with expensive obfuscation.

== See also ==
- Analysis paralysis
- Satisficing
- Search theory
- Perfect competition
- Price dispersion
- Cost
