= Leverage (negotiation) =

Ability to influence another side in negotiations

In negotiation, leverage is the power that one side of a negotiation has to influence the other side to move closer to their negotiating position. A party's leverage is based on its ability to award benefits or impose costs on the other side. Another conceptualization holds that the party that has the most to lose from a "no deal" outcome has less leverage than the party that has the least to lose.

Leverage has been described as "negotiation's prime mover," indicating its important role in bargaining and negotiation situations. Individuals with strong leverage can sometimes overcome weak negotiating skills, whereas those with poor leverage have a reduced likelihood of being successful even if they have strong negotiating skills.

== Bargaining power ==
It is said that those that one has discretion over can provide leverage and this can be demonstrated in the way advertising time sellers have bargaining power at holiday time or television shows if their advertisement slots are full. In order for a negotiating side's leverage to work in their favor, the threats or promises they put forth must be perceived as credible by the opposing group. This does not mean that the threats and promises have to be based in facts, but the opposing group must believe that a specific threat or promise can be carried out and that it would make them better or worse off compared to the other side.

Leverage can be measured qualitatively in terms of how much one side has to lose from not coming to an agreement. Generally, the side or group that is most in need of an agreement has the least leverage. The side or group that is willing to walk away (when this is a possibility) has the most leverage.

A key aspect of leverage is that it is a dynamic rather than a static factor. This means that it can change as more information is gathered or the situation evolves. A hostage situation is a prime example of how leverage can be dynamic. Early on in a hostage situation, control is held by the hostage takers; they have the greatest leverage: the lives of their hostages. However, as the situation evolves, effective hostage negotiators can gain leverage, take control, and eventually free the hostages. Here, the fear of "no deal" can shift back and forth between the participants so that leverage changes moment by moment.

== Types of leverage ==
There are three types of leverage: positive leverage, negative leverage, and normative leverage.

=== Positive leverage ===
Positive leverage is a negotiator's ability to provide things that his or her opponent wants. Positive leverage is based in the ability of one party to satisfy the needs of another party. The power from positive leverage comes from the opportunity to provide or withhold the needed item or action. The strength of this type of leverage is determined by the other alternatives available to the opposition (often referred to as the "BATNA" or the best alternative to a negotiated agreement). If there are others who can also fulfill the opposition's needs, then the leverage is weakened since the opposition can go elsewhere to receive what they need.

In politics, an example of positive leverage is logrolling, or vote trading. Legislators will promise to vote the way that another legislator wants on one issue in order to gain their opponent's vote on another issue.

=== Negative leverage ===
Negative leverage is a threat-based form of leverage that represents one side's ability to make the other side worse off. The power of negative leverage relies on loss aversion. Because potential losses are seen as worse than equivalent gains, negative leverage can be very powerful. However, it can also bring out strong reactions from the opposing party, straining the relationship. Neither party's interests are advanced by negative leverage except for the gain that the party employing the leverage may get towards their ultimate desired outcome from the negotiation.

Picketing in labor negotiations is an example of negative leverage. The goal of picketing is to attract negative attention to the employer, but the employees do not gain any material benefits from the act of picketing itself.

=== Normative leverage ===
Normative leverage relies on using social standards or norms to encourage consensus. It draws from the principle of consistency, using such standards and norms as well as coherent positioning to advance or protect a position. This type of leverage is maximized when the negotiating groups agree on these social standards or norms and see them as relevant to the discussion at hand. Normative leverage stems from people's desire to be consistent and reasonable in their decision-making.

An example of normative leverage would be for one party to appeal to another's religious or moral standards as grounds for acting in a certain way. Richard Shell refers to the Hanafi hostage situation as an example of using normative leverage in his book on bargaining and negotiation. Hostage negotiators read from and discussed the Koran (or Quran) with the hostage takers in order to encourage the peaceful release of remaining hostages.

== Improving leverage ==
Since leverage changes over the course of a negotiation, a party's leverage can be improved through a number of ways.

=== Creating coalitions ===
Forming a coalition with other parties during a negotiation can increase the amount of leverage that group has over opposition. The improved leverage is a result of group dynamics which often favor the group with the largest membership. Studies in social psychology have found that individuals will often conform to the beliefs of the larger group.

=== Gathering more information ===
As a negotiation moves forward, each party learns more about what the other side wants, its priorities, and its vulnerabilities. This information can shape the threats and promises that each side can make, as well as their weight. Gathering information about the opposition and limiting the release of information about your position can help a party gain or maintain leverage.

=== Time ===
Time can be a key factor in a negotiation. The party with the most patience and ability to wait has greater leverage. As time moves forward, leverage can shift if one group needs to come to a resolution sooner than the other. Transportation workers, for example, can use time to their advantage by conducting last minute strikes that put increased pressure on their employer to settle labor disputes in order to be able to fulfill their obligations to their customers.

== Coercion ==
If leverage is abused it can lead to coercion. This happens most often with the use of negative leverage. The improper use of negative leverage can put the opposing party in duress, leading them to make decisions that they normally would not if they had free will. Abuse of positive leverage can also lead to coercion, including bribery and blackmail.

== See also ==
- Porter 5 forces analysis
