= Beveridge curve =

Relationship between unemployment and job vacancies

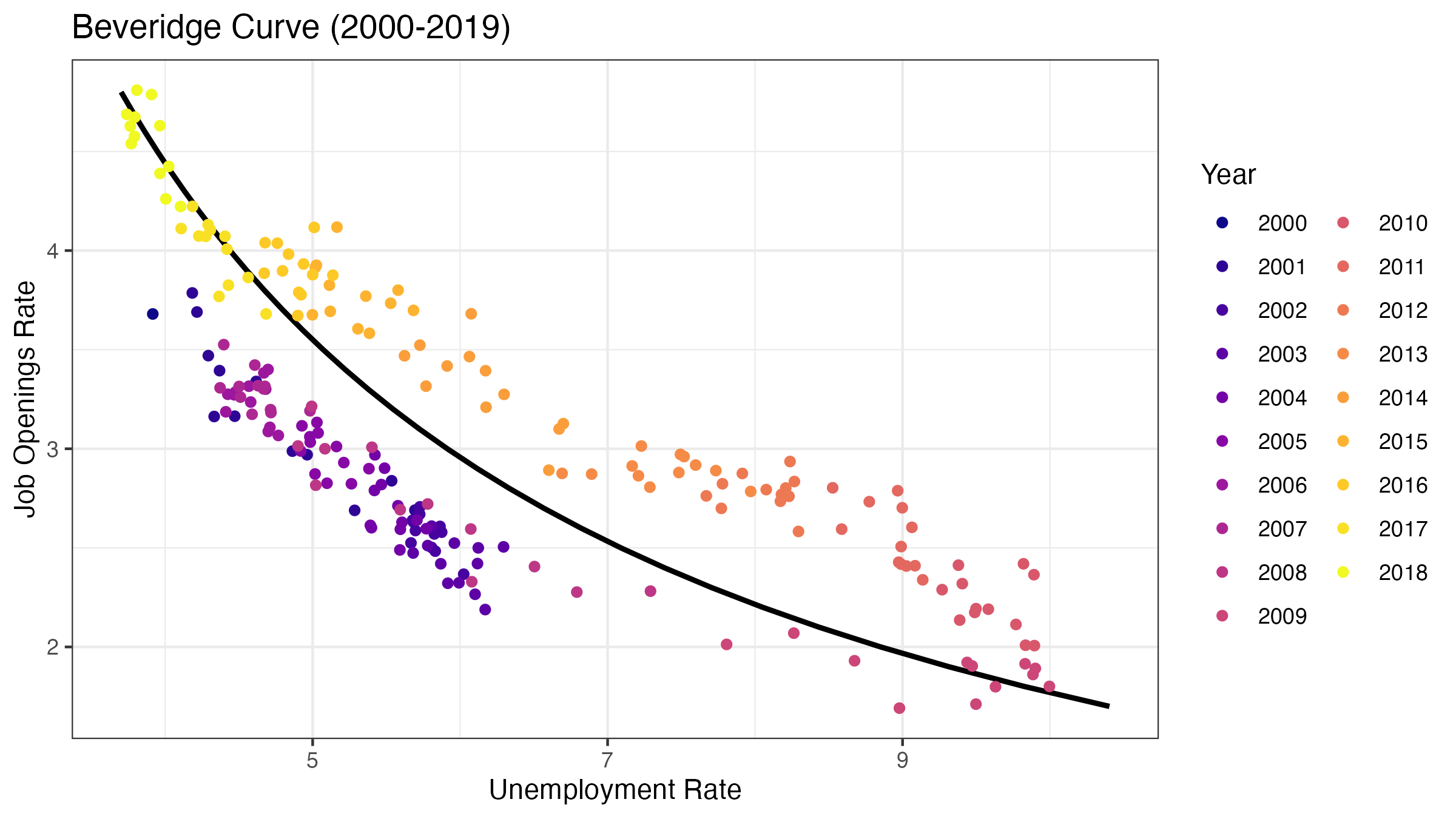
Beveridge curve of vacancy rate and unemployment rate data from the United States Bureau of Labor Statistics

A Beveridge curve, or UV curve, is a graphical representation of the relationship between unemployment and the job vacancy rate. The curve is a downward sloping locus of unemployment and vacancy combinations that are consistent with the flow into unemployment equalling the flow out of unemployment. Typically, vacancies are on the vertical axis and unemployment on the horizontal. The position on the curve can indicate the current state of the economy in the business cycle. For example, recessionary periods are indicated by high unemployment and low vacancies, corresponding to a position on the lower side of the 45° line, and high vacancies and low unemployment indicate the expansionary periods on the upper side of the 45° line.

The curve, named after William Beveridge, is hyperbolic-shaped and slopes downward, as a higher rate of unemployment normally occurs with a lower rate of vacancies. Movement outward over time results in a fixed level of vacancies associated with a higher level of unemployment, interpreted as decreasing efficiency in the labor market.

== Historical development ==
In 1944, William Beveridge, in Full Employment in A Free Society, argued that fluctuating unemployment levels are driven by changes in demand for workers. This implied a negative relationship between the number of job openings and the unemployment rate. Because the curve enabled economists to analyze many of the problems that Beveridge had addressed, including the mismatch between unemployment and vacancies, at aggregate and sector levels, the curve was most likely named for him in the 1980s.

Beveridge never created a visual representation of the curve, and was instead first graphically depicted in 1958 by Christopher Dow and Leslie Arthur Dicks-Mireaux. They were interested in measuring excess demand in the goods market for the guidance of Keynesian fiscal policies and took British data on vacancies and unemployment in the labor market as a proxy, since excess demand is unobservable. By 1958, they had 12 years of data available since the British government had started collecting data on unfilled vacancies from notification at labor exchanges in 1946. Dow and Dicks-Mireaux presented the unemployment and vacancy data in an unemployment-vacancy (UV) space and derived an idealized UV-curve as a rectangular hyperbola after they had connected successive observations.

This curve enabled economists to use an analytical method, later known as UV-analysis, to decompose unemployment into different types of unemployment: deficient-demand (or cyclical) unemployment and structural unemployment. In the first half of the 1970s, that method was refined by economists of the National Institute of Economic and Social Research (NIESR), in London, so that a classification arose that corresponded to the 'traditional' classification: a division of unemployment into frictional, structural and deficient demand unemployment, according to a 1976 analysis. Both the Beveridge curve and the Phillips curve bear implicit macroeconomic notions of equilibrium in markets, despite demonstrated inconsistencies.

== Empirical applications ==
The US calculates the Beveridge curve using Bureau of Labor Statistics' Job Opening and Labor Turnover Survey (JOLTS) data. A UV curve may be calculated for specific industries or demographic groups, to disentangle drivers of movement realized in the aggregate curve.

Potential theories to explain temporary homothetic shifts of the Beveridge curve exist. Empirical data has documented a number of these events. Following the Great Recession in 2008, there was a marked shift in the Beveridge curve. A 2012 International Monetary Fund (IMF) said the shift can be explained in part by "extended unemployment insurance benefits" and "skill mismatch" between unemployed persons and vacancies. In 2021, during the ongoing COVID-19 pandemic, there was a marked shift outward in the US Beveridge curve, as workers were dismissed and eventually there was rehiring activity in different geographies and sectors. A number of recent economic studies have found nonlinearities between the ratio of vacancies to the unemployment rate, both variables plotted by the curve.

Movement along the curve is well documented. Throughout the business cycle, the economy will operate at a point along the curve, with fluctuations. During recessions, unemployment increases and vacancy rate decreases; in expansions the unemployment rate decreases while the vacancy rate increases.

== Theory of curve movements ==
Theoretically, these shifts correspond to proportional changes in labor market tightness and vacancies that reflect disruptions to overall matching efficiency. A change in labor market tightness signals increasing or decreasing efficiencies in the labor market.

=== Matching process ===
The matching process determines the efficiency of matching workers to open roles - or matching supply and demand in the labor market. Improvements in the matching system would shift the curve towards the origin, as an efficient matching process allows workers to jobs faster, filling vacancies and employing the unemployed. Improvements can be made by increasing the mobility of labor, the introduction of agencies, such as job centers, and lower rates of unionization, according to a 2001 article on OECD that compared unemployment and wages in the OECD from the 1960s to the 1990s.

=== Skills mismatch ===
Skills mismatches occur when there are changes in the skills employers demand versus the available skills held by workers within the labor pool. Greater skills mismatches increase inefficiency in the labor market, and thus shifts the Beveridge curve outward. If that were the driving factor behind the shift, one would expect to also see employers bid up wages for the few candidates who were desirable. Although the US Beveridge curve shifted outward in the 2010–2012 period, wages did not increase.

=== Labor force participation ===
Labor force participation rate (LFPR), which measures the number of individuals searching for a job, will effect the rate of unemployment. Those workers who stop searching for work are excluded from the unemployment rate. Therefore, as LFPR decreases, the unemployment rate decreases. LFPR has been declining in the US since the early 2000s. This long term unemployment may be driven by deteriorating human capital or a negative perception of the unemployed by the potential employers. Contrarily, as the number of individuals looking for jobs increases relative to the total population, the unemployment rate increases, shifting the curve outwards from the origin. Labor force participation may increase due to changes in education, gender roles, population age and immigration.

=== Frictional unemployment ===
Frictional unemployment: Frictions result from the failure of the assumptions that both workers and employers know of all existing opportunities in the labor market and that contracting at a new job is costless. Because labor markets are not perfectly competitive, there are some frictions as individuals and firms search for new matches. Economists, therefore, measure the difference between the average unemployment rate and the frictional unemployment rate as the rate of technical efficiency of the labor market. Frictional unemployment can be caused by unexpected or involuntary job losses, resignations and job creation.

=== Economic uncertainty ===
Market and policy uncertainty may cause employers to hold vacancies open longer in the search for the perfect candidate, acute during periods of high unemployment, where the number of candidates is high. Uncertainty tends to shift the curve outward.

== Context in macroeconomic theory ==
=== 21st century business cycle theory ===
The Beveridge curve is relevant for recently developed macroeconomic theory. It is based on matching models of employment in the economy, which extends the logic of the New Keynesian general equilibrium model, where prices and wages are somewhat rigid, making the relationship between vacancies and unemployment of empirical and theoretical interest. Because New Keynesian models do not assume the market for labor always clears, the difference between vacancies and unemployment becomes of interest.

Within the business cycle, fluctuations along the Beveridge curve are expected. When the unemployment and vacancy rates are equal, some economists consider this the period of full employment, identified as a 45° ray from the origin of the graph. Therefore, the market is considered inefficiently tight whenever the Beveridge curve is above the 45° ray and inefficiently slack whenever the curve is below the 45° ray.

=== Phillips curve ===
Recent economic theory has linked the Phillips curve to the Beveridge curve. Particularly, the Phillips curve tells us that economic growth leads to a tightening of labor supply and subsequently, an increase in prices. Historically, economists have used the unemployed rate to measure this labor market tightness, but more recently the ration between vacancies and unemployed individuals, the V/U (or U/V), has demonstrated a better fit to empirical applications. This improvement is driven by the movements in the Beveridge curve, particularly the matching frictions.

=== Skills matching vs. labor market matching ===
Skill shortages should not be confused with labor shortages. What distinguishes an objective shortage of labor from a skill-related shortage (i.e. a special case of skill mismatch) is the presence of a pool of unemployed individuals (non-discouraged job seekers) willing to take up jobs in the labor market considered at the ongoing rate. Nevertheless, even in presence of unemployment, and assuming that there is adequate demand for labor in the market, a skill shortage may be difficult to identify for at least two reasons:

1. Identifying the source of observed unemployed is difficult. It may be frictional, due to short-run costs of searching. It may be driven by fluctuations in the business cycle, or it may be structural, such that there are sector or activity level changes in the economy.
2. Skill shortages may be caused by both "horizontal" skill mismatch, when workers have qualifications different than the one required by the firms, or by "vertical" skill mismatch, where workers' skills and qualifications are lower levels than what firms require.

Economists generally believe that labor markets adjust to such imbalances, especially over time, but it is also possible for such mismatches to persist for many years or decades. Public policy interventions to change or improve the match of workers to employers might be appropriate in such cases.

== See also ==
- Frisch elasticity of labor supply
- Labor economics
- Search theory
- Search-and-matching theory
- Types of unemployment
- Phillips curve
- Natural rate of unemployment
- Involuntary unemployment
- Ghost job

== Sources ==
- Barro, Robert J.; Grilli, Vittorio (1994). "Unemployment". European Macroeconomics. London: Palgrave Macmillan. ISBN 978-0-333-57764-6.
- Blanchard, Olivier Jean; Diamond, Peter; Hall, Robert E.; Yellen, Janet (1989). "The Beveridge Curve". Brookings Papers on Economic Activity. 1989 (1): 1–76. doi:10.2307/2534495. ISSN 0007-2303. JSTOR 2534495. S2CID 153769498.
- Elsby, Michael W. L., Ryan Michaels, and David Ratner. 2015. "The Beveridge Curve: A Survey." Journal of Economic Literature 53 (3): 571–630. DOI: 10.1257/jel.53.3.571
- Ehrenberg, R.G., Smith, R.S., & Hallock, K.F. (2021). Modern Labor Economics: Theory and Public Policy (14th ed.). Routledge. https://doi.org/10.4324/9780429327209
- "The Beveridge curve". FRED Blog. May 29, 2014.
