= NOPA =

NOPA can refer to:

- Norwegian Society of Composers and Lyricists, a society for Norwegian musicians
- NOPA (wine), a technique to measure amino acids in grape juice
- NOPA (optics), a technique in nonlinear optics
- No possible agreement, the opposite of a zone of possible agreement
- USS Oscar Austin, an American destroyer launched in 1998 (callsign NOPA)
- National Office Products Alliance; see List of acronyms: N#NO
- National Office Products Association; see List of acronyms: N#NO
