= Compensating differential =

Concept in labour economics

Wage differential is a term used in labour economics to analyze the relation between the wage rate and the unpleasantness, risk, or other undesirable attributes of a particular job. A compensating differential, which is also called a compensating wage differential or an equalizing difference, is defined as the additional amount of income that a given worker must be offered in order to motivate them to accept a given undesirable job, relative to other jobs that worker could perform. One can also speak of the compensating differential for an especially desirable job, or one that provides special benefits, but in this case the differential would be negative: that is, a given worker would be willing to accept a lower wage for an especially desirable job, relative to other jobs.

The idea of compensating differentials has been used to analyze issues such as the risk of future unemployment, the risk of injury, the risk of unsafe intercourse, the monetary value workers place on their own lives, and in explaining geographical wage differentials.

== Geographical wage differentials ==
There is a wide literature dealing with geographical wage differentials. Following the neoclassical assumption of clearing labour markets, where there is a more attractive area to live in and if labour mobility is perfect, then more and more workers will move to this area which in turn will increase the supply of labour in this area and in turn depress wages. If the attractiveness of that area compared to other areas do not change, the wage rate will be set at such a rate that workers would be indifferent between living in areas that are more attractive but with a lower wage and living in areas which are less attractive and with a higher wage. Henceforth, a sustained equilibrium with different wage rates across different areas can happen.

=== The theory ===
The theory of compensating wage differentials, by Adam Smith, provides a theoretical framework of the ideology behind pay differences. The theory explains that jobs with undesirable characteristics will compensate with higher wages compared to the popular, more desirable jobs, who provide lower wages to its workers. Competition in labour markets ensures that the net advantages of different jobs will tend to equality. Thus, higher pay in some areas of the country is expected where the cost-of-living is higher while higher pay is also necessary to compensate for a less pleasant working environment. The rate of pay in the private sector represents (according to the hypothesis) the exact rate necessary to attract and retain staff. Thus all else equal a higher rate of pay in one area means that this area is less attractive (either has low amenity levels or higher cost-of-living). The pay offered in this area is set to counter the relative unattractiveness of the region. Some empirical studies have tried to test this assumption. Most of this research is interested in inter geographical wage disparities. The research ask the question: how can geographical wage differentials be explained?

=== Employment benefits ===
Employees who receive employment benefits, like health insurance, are trading in higher wages for better benefits because the benefits are valuable to the employee and offered at a lower rate through their employer, compared to outside vendors. On the contrary, if an employer offers a health insurance plan with low coverage that is not attractive to employees, the wages at the firm will likely not be reduced due to the low participation in the health insurance plan. In this scenario, employees would prefer to receive higher wages and lower quality benefits. Transitioning the firm's expenses from wages to health insurance coverage allows the employees to receive quality health insurance by forgoing the option to get paid higher wages. Similar to the ideology of compensating wage differential where employees receive higher wages at undesirable/risky jobs and lower wages at safe/desirable jobs, receiving several employee benefits results in lower monetary compensation.

=== Hedonic wage function ===
The hedonic wage function represents the assumption that employees maximize their utility in job selection to a budget constraint outlined by the labor market. The hedonic wage function graphically displays the compensating wage differential between a firm and its employees. The function's slope represents the best fit line going through the indifference curves, representing wages and the probability of injury while at work. The function is upward sloping due to the parallel relationship between wages and the undesirable qualities of a job; the more undesirable the job is, the higher the wages employees are compensated for working at the company. The mean and variance of the function vary based on the data, whether the data is firm-level or employee-level data. The equilibrium of the hedonic wage function between employee wages and non-wage-related attributes for a particular job argues there is a minimal correlation to workers' preferences.

=== Empirical results ===
Most of the empirical results from the literature attempt to decompose the geographical wage differentials according to human capital characteristics. Areas with more skilled workers will tend to have higher mean wages. Though, average wages may differ among different areas because they offer different levels of amenities. It is usually believed in economics that wages in areas where the level of amenity is high comparatively to other areas will be lower. Empirical research has attempted to measure area characteristics in order to measure this effect on average wages. Though, some characteristics may be attractive for some workers but because workers may have different utilities, other workers may not be attracted by these characteristics. The following assumption is usually made: workers among a similar occupation will share similar utility function, then it is possible to measure the characteristics of areas on the mean wage of a particular occupation.

==== Human capital ====
Some articles have brought evidence that wages differ across areas in different countries using a decomposition analysis of the mean wage. In 1992, Reilly used this decomposition technique to decompose wage differentials between 6 local labour markets in the UK. The decomposition allows to decompose mean wage differences into two parts, one which is the consequence of individual characteristics in those 6 labour markets (Note: Aberdeen, Coventry, Kircaldy, Northampton, Rochdale and Swindon are the six local labour markets used.) and the other one which is due to unexplained differences. The author finds that the differences in wages between labour markets is at around 20%, and that between Aberdeen and Rochdale, 50% of this difference is explained by workers' characteristics, the other part is not explained. The unexplained differences can be thought of being consequences of differences in local areas attractiveness. Though this author does not give any evidence that this is the case. Similar results are obtained by García and Molina for Spain (Note: They divided Spain into 5 main regions (North, South, East, Centre and Madrid) and used the Oaxaca technique) with data from 1994 (Note: They use a cross sectional data for 1994 (European Community Household panel) combined with regional price and population data from the National Statistics Institute (INE). They have 4450 individual observations that were divided into 5 main regions (North, South, East, Centre and Madrid). They introduce controls into their wage equations for occupation, education, industry, gender, age, tenure and whether they have a second language.) Pereira and Galego analysed wage differentials in Portugal using dynamics. They also found similar results to García and Molina and to Reilly. (Note: They use data from the Quadros de Pessoal for 1995 and 2002. This data is compulsory for all employers with at least one employee. It is completed and sent to the ministry of employment of Portugal. It does not concern employees of public administration, the armed forces and self employed professionals. They considered only workers between 16 and 65 and excluded fisheries, agriculture and unpaid family workers and apprentices. They also excluded workers in Madeira and the Açores.)

==== Area characteristics ====
Part of the attractiveness of areas is the cost-of-living. An area with a lower cost-of-living should be more attractive than areas with an expensive cost-of-living. Unfortunately, it is difficult to measure within countries cost-of-living. In an article published in 1983, Shah and Walker estimated a wage equation for male white workers in the UK using the general household survey of 1973 (Note: . They adjust their regressions on individual characteristics, industry mix and cost-of-living. They introduced regional dummies for 15 regions:Greater London, South East, West Midlands, North West, Scotland (West Coast, East Coast, North and South), Wales (South East and not South East), South West, East Midlands, East Anglia, York/Humberside, North East.) The cost-of-living proxy is taken from Reward Regional Surveys Ltd which publish reports on cost-of-living and regional comparisons from 1974 up to at least 1996 The description of the construction of those cost-of-living is not clear. (Note: The descriptions in Shad and Walker (1983) and in Johnston et al. (1996) are not very clear. Though that is how it can be summarised: the Reward Group assumes that households with two adults and two children of age 10 and 13 are representatives of the "communities". From those households they gather 200 retail prices in 100 locations to which are added 18 regional prices for fuel and car insurances and 31 national prices covering newspapers, stamps, licences etc. The prices are weighted according to eight patterns of expenditure of the households.) Wage differentials change and sometimes are reversed when they introduce the cost-of-living, Scotland and the South East of England are worse off when introducing cost-of-living compared to the Midlands regions. This result can be though of some evidence of the fact that differences in monetary reward are not the same as the differences in real-term awards. This suggests that the differences in wages between regions compensate at least partly for differences in cost-of-living. In 1991, Blackaby and Murphy estimated standardised geographical wage differentials (Note: The authors estimated a wage equation with a complete set of industry, regional dummies and interactions between the two using the General Household Survey of 1982. They restricted their sample to individuals who had worked more than 27 hours and had reported weekly earnings which resulted in a sample of 6999 individuals. They also controlled for individual characteristics (age, age square, gender, experience and education).) and then explained these geographical wage differentials with a set of weather, (Note: They used year averages of rainfall, sunshine, gale days … Taken from the monthly weather report of the meteorological offices.) environmental (Note: They used atmospheric pollution, road congestion and the overall provision of recreational facilities.) and prices indexes. (Note: They matched their data with the New Earnings Survey data of the same year (1982). They introduced additional control for size of the plant and effort based on workers paid by results. They also included data on union wages. In the UK in 1982, wages, if set by collective bargaining, have national collective bargain as well as local ones. Thus they used proportions of people covered by either national bargaining, national and local ones for each regions of their analysis.) The authors include other variables based on two other theories: efficiency wage and search theory. The results provide some evidence that workers are not suffering from money illusion as areas with prices higher by 10% than another area also have wages 10% higher. In consequence, wage do compensate for local differences in prices. In England, wages are usually thought of being better in the South than in the North of the country. Though Blackaby and Murphy show that wages when controlled for individual characteristics, occupations characteristics, cost-of-living and industry mix are better in the North than in the South (Note: The South is defined as South-East, South-West, East Anglia, East Midlands.) for manual workers. Thus they conclude that it makes sense for unemployed in the North to wait and look for a job in the North as that is where they will get relatively better pay. This give some extra evidence that wage differentials compensate, at least partly, for geographical differences in cost-of-living.

== Discussion ==
=== Possible confusion with other concepts ===
The terms compensation differential, pay differential, and wage differential (see wage dispersion or economic inequality) are also used in economics, but normally have a different meaning. They simply refer to differences in total pay (or the wage rate) in any context. So a 'compensation differential' can be explained by many factors, such as differences in the skills of the workers in those jobs, the country or geographical area in which those jobs are performed, or the characteristics of the jobs themselves. A 'compensating differential', in contrast, refers exclusively to differences in pay due to differences in the jobs themselves, for a given worker (or for two identical workers).

In the theory of price indices, economists also use the term compensating variation, which is yet another unrelated concept. A 'compensating variation' is the change in wealth required to leave a consumer's well-being unchanged when prices change.

== See also ==
- Wages
- Labor economics
- Hedonic pricing
- Search theory
