= No-reserve auction =

A no-reserve auction (NR), also known as an absolute auction, is an auction in which the item for sale will be sold regardless of price.

From the seller's perspective, advertising an auction as having no reserve price can be desirable (but risky) because it potentially attracts a greater number of bidders due to the possibility of a bargain. If more bidders attend the auction, a higher price might ultimately be achieved because of heightened competition from bidders. This contrasts with a reserve auction, where the item for sale may not be sold if the final bid is not high enough to satisfy the seller. In practice, an auction advertised as "absolute" or "no-reserve" may nonetheless still not sell to the highest bidder on the day, for example, if the seller withdraws the item from the auction or extends the auction period indefinitely, although these practices may be restricted by law in some jurisdictions or under the terms of sale available from the auctioneer.

Notwithstanding that an auction is advertised to be with No Reserve, a starting price may be stipulated by the seller. Any bids that do not meet or exceed the starting price set by the Seller are deemed to be invalid, though are considered an offer to purchase until otherwise rejected or withdrawn (or the item is sold by way of auction).
