= Zone of possible agreement =

Concept in business theory

The zone of possible agreement (ZOPA), also known as zone of potential agreement or bargaining range, is the range of options available to two parties involved in sales and negotiation, where the respective minimum targets of the parties overlap. Where no such overlap is given, in other words where there is no rational agreement possibility, the inverse notion of NOPA (no possible agreement) applies. Where there is a ZOPA, an agreement within the zone is rational for both sides. Outside the zone no amount of negotiation should yield an agreement.

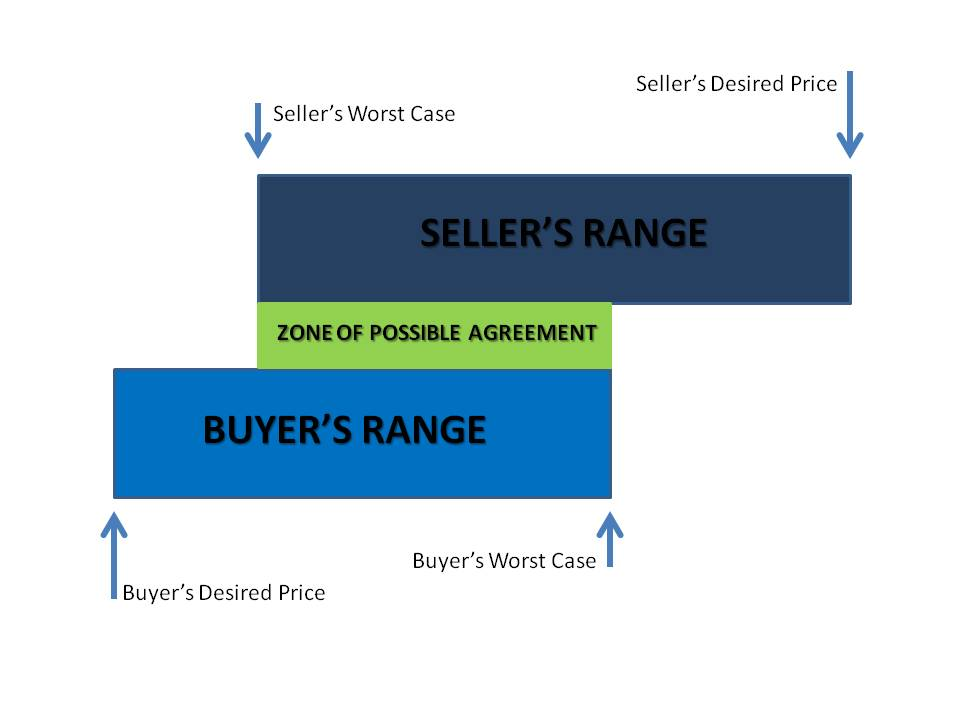
Zone of Possible Agreement shown graphically

An understanding of the ZOPA is critical for a successful negotiation, but the negociants must first know their BATNA (best alternative to a negotiated agreement), or "walk away positions". To determine whether there is a ZOPA both parties must explore each other's interests and values. This should be done early in the negotiation and be adjusted as more information is learned. Essential is also the ZOPA's size. Where a broad ZOPA is given, the parties might use strategies and tactics to influence the distribution within the ZOPA. Where the parties have a small ZOPA, the difficulty lies in finding agreeable terms.

== Understanding and leveraging ZOPA in negotiations ==
The Zone of Possible Agreement (ZOPA), also known as the Zone of Potential Agreement or Bargaining Range, refers to the range in which two negotiating parties can find common ground. It exists when the minimum terms each party is willing to accept overlap. If no overlap exists, a No Possible Agreement (NOPA) situation arises. Understanding ZOPA is crucial for successful negotiations, as it determines whether a mutually beneficial deal is possible (Fisher, Ury, & Patton, 2011).

=== 1. Understanding ZOPA ===
==== Definition and importance ====
ZOPA is the area where agreement is feasible and beneficial for both sides. Without a clear ZOPA, negotiation efforts may be futile. Successful negotiators identify and analyze the ZOPA early in the negotiation process (Lewicki, Saunders, & Barry, 2015).

==== Relationship with BATNA ====
Each party must understand their BATNA, which is the best alternative they have if no agreement is reached. A strong BATNA strengthens a negotiator's position, as they can walk away if the proposed deal falls outside their acceptable range (Fisher & Ury, 2011).

=== 2. Factors influencing ZOPA ===
==== a. Information and research ====
Negotiators must assess the other party's needs, constraints, and objectives to determine if a ZOPA exists. This requires thorough research and strategic questioning (Shell, 2006).

==== b. Power dynamics and leverage ====
The side with a stronger BATNA has greater leverage, allowing them to push negotiations in their favor. Understanding this dynamic helps negotiators position themselves effectively (Malhotra & Bazerman, 2007).

==== c. Emotional and psychological aspects ====
Cognitive biases, risk tolerance, and emotional intelligence impact how negotiators perceive and use ZOPA. Recognizing these psychological factors helps negotiators make rational decisions (Goleman, 1995).

=== 3. Determining ZOPA in negotiations ===
To determine ZOPA, negotiators must openly explore each other's interests and priorities. This process should start early and be adjusted as more information is revealed (Thompson, 2014).

==== Hidden vs. explicit ZOPA ====
Some negotiations have a clearly defined ZOPA (e.g., salary negotiations), while others require in-depth discussions to uncover potential overlaps (Shell, 2006).

=== 4. Challenges in ZOPA negotiations ===
==== Small or nonexistent ZOPA ====
If the gap between parties is too large, reaching an agreement may be difficult. In such cases, alternative negotiation techniques like compromises, incentives, or reframing the deal may help (Fisher & Ury, 2011).

==== Misjudging ZOPA and deadlocks ====
Misconceptions about the other party's willingness or constraints can lead to deadlocks. Effective communication and information sharing help avoid this issue (Thompson, 2014).

==== Trust and communication barriers ====
A lack of trust can prevent parties from openly discussing their needs, making it harder to find a ZOPA. Building rapport and transparency improves negotiation outcomes (Malhotra & Bazerman, 2007).

==== Salary and job offer negotiations ====
Employees and employers negotiate within ZOPA based on salary expectations and budget constraints. Expanding ZOPA through benefits (e.g., bonuses, remote work) can help close gaps (*Shell, 2006*).

==== Business and sales deals ====
Companies negotiating contracts or sales agreements assess ZOPA based on pricing, delivery terms, and warranties. Customizing solutions often helps reach mutually beneficial terms (Lewicki et al., 2015).

==== Conflict resolution and diplomacy ====
International negotiations rely on ZOPA to settle disputes. Diplomats explore creative solutions, trade-offs, and long-term benefits to align interests (*Thompson, 2014*).

== Identifying a ZOPA ==
To determine whether there is a positive bargaining zone each party must understand their bottom line or worst case price. For example, Paul is selling his car and refuses to sell it for less than $5,000 (his worst case price). Sarah is interested and negotiates with Paul. If she offers him anything higher than $5,000 there is a positive bargaining zone, if she is unwilling to pay more than $4,500 there is a negative bargaining zone.

A ZOPA exists if there is an overlap between each party's reservation price (bottom line). A negative bargaining zone is when there is no overlap. With a negative bargaining zone both parties may (and should) walk away. Through a rational analysis of the ZOPA in business negotiations, you will be better equipped to avoid the traps of reaching an agreement for agreement's sake and viewing the negotiation as a pie to be divided.

== Positive bargaining zone ==
In negotiation, when the terms and conditions of the buyer aligns with that of the seller, they are said to be in a positive bargaining zone. For example, Sam is willing to buy a second- hand laptop for $20,000 and Ram wants to sell his laptop for $20,000, there is a positive bargaining zone where both the buyer and the seller's terms can be met.

== Negative bargaining zone ==
It occurs when people negotiate and cannot reach a ZOPA, so they are in negative bargaining zone. So they cannot reach a deal in negative bargaining zone, as there is no mutual understanding among them. For example, Sam wants to sell his house for $9200 to buy a better apartment. but Alex wants to buy it for $7800 and cannot go higher, here the negative bargaining zone occurs.

== Overcoming a negative bargaining zone ==
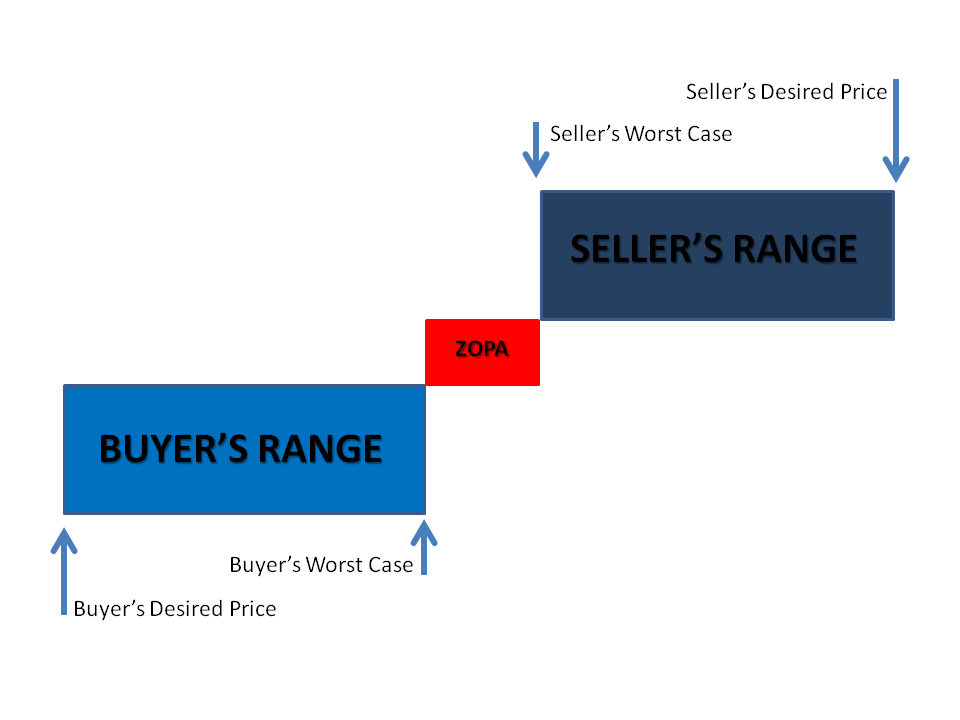
A negative bargaining zone shown graphically

A negative bargaining zone may be overcome by "enlarging the pie". In integrative negotiations when dealing with a variety of issues and interests, parties that combine interests to create value reach a far more rewarding agreement. Behind every position there are usually more common interests than conflicting ones.

In the example above, Sarah is unwilling to pay more than $4,500 and Paul will not accept anything less than $5,000. However, Sarah may be willing throw in some skis she received as a gift but never used. Paul, who was going to use some of the car money to buy some skis, agrees. Paul accepted less than his bottom line because value was added to the negotiation. Both parties "win".

A negotiator should always start considering both parties' ZOPA at the earliest stage of his or her preparations and constantly refine and adjust these figures as the process proceeds. For every interest there often exists several possible solutions that could satisfy it.

== See also ==
- Bargaining
- Best alternative to a negotiated agreement
- Search theory
- Transaction cost
