= Job hunting =

Act of looking for employment

Job hunting, job seeking, or job searching is the act of looking for employment, due to unemployment, underemployment, discontent with a current position, or a desire for a better position. The immediate goal of job seeking is usually to obtain a job interview with an employer which may lead to getting hired. The job hunter or seeker typically first looks for job vacancies or employment opportunities.

== Steps ==
=== Locating jobs ===
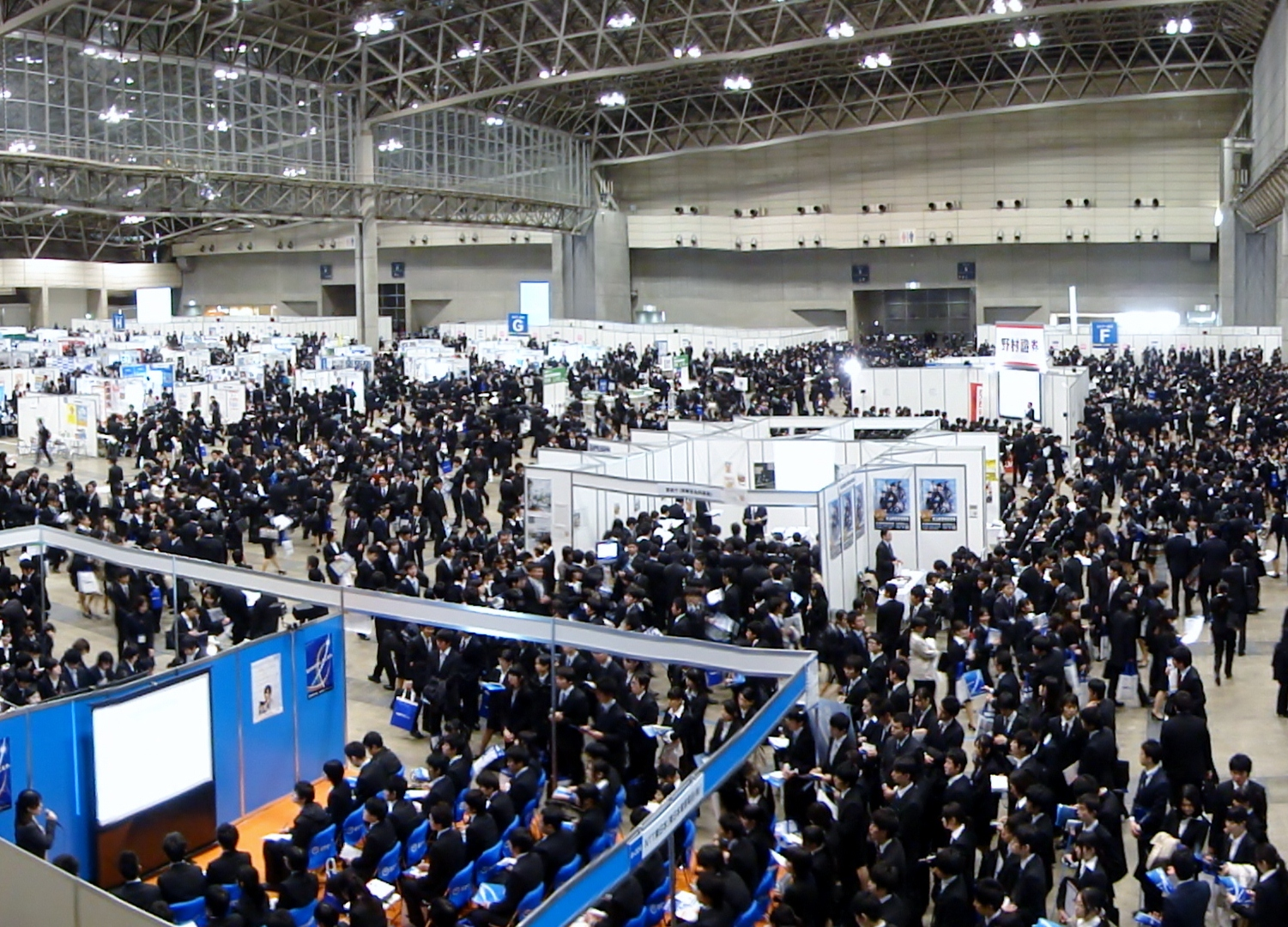
Job fair for new university graduates in Japan, an example of the Japanese custom of simultaneous recruiting of new graduates.

Common methods of job hunting are:

- Finding a job through a friend or an extended business network, personal network
- Through social media platforms, some of which have inbuilt job platforms and searches
- Using an employment website
- Job listing search engines
- Looking through the classifieds in newspapers
- Using a private or public employment agency or recruiter / headhunter
- Looking on a company's web site for open jobs, typically in its applicant tracking system
- Going to a job or careers fair
- Using professional guidance such as outplacement services that give training in writing a résumé, applying for jobs and how to be successful at an interview.
- Visiting an organization to find out whether it is recruiting staff or will be doing so in the near future and contacting the hiring manager or Human Resources department

As of 2010, less than 10% of U.S. jobs are filled through online ads.

=== Researching the employers ===
Many job seekers research the employers to which they are applying, and some employers see evidence of this as a positive sign of enthusiasm for the position or the company, or as a mark of thoroughness. Information collected might include open positions, full name, locations, web site, business description, year established, revenues, number of employees, stock price if public, name of chief executive officer, major products or services, major competitors, and strengths and weaknesses.

=== Networking ===
Contacting as many people as possible is a highly effective way to find a job. It is estimated that 50% or higher of all jobs are found through networking.

Job recruiters and decision makers are increasingly using online social networking sites to gather information about job applicants, according to a mid-2011 Jobvite survey of 800 employers in the US.

Likewise, job seekers are beginning to use social networking sites to advertise their skills and post resumes. Today, job seekers can use resources such as Google+’s Circles, Facebook’s BranchOut, LinkedIn’s InMaps, and Twitter’s Lists to make employers notice them in a unique way. In 2014, using these social media networks has led to 1 of 6 job seekers finding employment.

Job seekers need to begin to pay more attention to what employers and recruiters find when they do their pre-interview information gathering about applicants, according to this 2010 study by Microsoft, "Online Reputation in a Connected World".

=== Applying ===
One can also go and hand out résumés or Curricula Vitae to prospective employers, in the hope that they are recruiting for staff or could soon be doing so. Résumés can also be submitted to online employment sites that aid in job searching. Another recommended method of job hunting is cold calling and, since the 1990s, emailing companies that one desires to work for to inquire whether there are any job vacancies.

After finding a desirable job, they would then apply for the job by responding to the advertisement. This may mean applying through a website, emailing or mailing in a hard copy of a résumé to a prospective employer. It is generally recommended that résumés be brief, organized, concise, and targeted to the position being sought. With certain occupations, such as graphic design or writing, portfolios of a job seeker's previous work are essential and are evaluated as much, if not more than the person's résumé. In most other occupations, the résumé should focus on past accomplishments, expressed in terms as concretely as possible (e.g. number of people managed, amount of increased sales or improved customer satisfaction).

Since the year 2000, the Internet has been increasingly popular method for job applications, with many companies giving job applicants the option of applying through their company website, while some companies now have no alternative form of recruitment.

=== Interviewing ===
Once an employer has received résumés, they will make a list of potential employees to be interviewed based on the résumé and any other information contributed. During the interview process, interviewers generally look for persons who they believe will be best for the job and work environment. The interview may occur in several rounds until the interviewer is satisfied and offers the job to the applicant.

== Job hunting in economic theory ==
Economists use the term "frictional unemployment" to mean unemployment resulting from the time and effort that must be expended before an appropriate job is found. This type of unemployment is always present in the economy. Search theory is the economic theory that studies the optimal decision of how much time and effort to spend searching, and which offers to accept or reject (in the context of a job hunt, or likewise in other contexts like searching for a low price). People in work who use their time off-duty to job search has recently become the norm due to new jobs being mostly temporary and/or part-time (usually with not set hours) or professions becoming freelance, with people hired for individual projects rather than a lifelong job.

== See also ==
- Employment counsellor
- Ethnic penalty
- Job-seeking expense tax deductions
- Precarious work
- Search theory
- Self-employment
- Simultaneous recruiting of new graduates
