= Wage dispersion =

Concept in economics

In economics, wage dispersion is the variation in wages encountered in an economy.

== See also ==
- Search theory
- Price dispersion
- Economic inequality
- Wage ratio

== Books ==
- Dale T. Mortensen (2005), Wage Dispersion: Why Are Similar Workers Paid Differently?, MIT Press. ISBN 0-262-63319-1
