= Search theory =

Theory in microeconomics

In microeconomics, search theory studies buyers or sellers who cannot instantly find a trading partner, and must therefore search for a partner prior to transacting. It involves determining the best approach to use when looking for a specific item or person in a sizable, uncharted environment. The goal of the theory is to determine the best search strategy, one that maximises the chance of finding the target while minimising search-related expenses.

Search theory clarifies how buyers and sellers choose when to acknowledge a coordinating offer for a transaction. Search theory also provides an explanation for why frictional unemployment happens as people look for jobs and corporations look for new employees.

Search theory can be applied primarily to explain labor market inefficiencies, but also for all forms of "buyers" and "sellers", whether products, homes or even spouses/partners. The clearing price will be met quickly as supply and demand react freely. However, this does not happen in the real world. Search theory tries to explain how. Real-world transactions involve discrete quantities of goods and services, imperfect and expensive information, and possible physical or other barriers separating buyers and sellers. Parties looking to conduct business, such as a potential employee and an employer, or a buyer and a seller of goods. Their search for one another is strained by this encounter. These restrictions can come in the form of geographical differences, differing expectations regarding price and specifications, and slow response and negotiation times from one of the parties.

Search theory has been applied in labor economics to analyze frictional unemployment resulting from job hunting by workers. In consumer theory, it has been applied to analyze purchasing decisions. From a worker's perspective, an acceptable job would be one that pays a high wage, one that offers desirable benefits, and/or one that offers pleasant and safe working conditions. From a consumer's perspective, a product worth purchasing would have sufficiently high quality and be offered at a sufficiently low price. In both cases, whether a given job or product is acceptable depends on the searcher's beliefs about the alternatives available in the market.

More precisely, search theory studies an individual's optimal strategy when choosing from a series of potential opportunities of random quality, under the assumption that delaying choice is costly. Search models illustrate how best to balance the cost of delay against the value of the option to try again. Mathematically, search models are optimal stopping problems.

Macroeconomists have extended search theory by studying general equilibrium models in which one or more types of searchers interact. These macroeconomic theories have been called 'matching theory', or search-and-matching theory.

== Foundation of search theory ==
In a traditional economic equilibrium, small changes in supply or demand have only a small effect on the price. However, in a pairwise matching setting, even slight imbalances can have significant effects on the allocation of resources. For example, in a marriage market with slightly more men than women, all matching rents go to women, and vice versa. Furthermore, the unique nature of the items for sale in a matching market makes it challenging to model as a traditional market. This poses a challenge for online matching services that aim to organize such markets efficiently. Therefore the search frictions affect equilibrium outcomes in matching markets and search theory examines the role of option value in decision-making, including where to search and how long to search. It highlights the relationship between risk and option value and can be modeled as sequential or simultaneous search.

=== Simultaneous search ===
The literature or research theory in economics regarding the Simultaneous Search in economics was first introduced by Stigler G. in 1961. In Stigler's simultaneous search model, a consumer selects how many searches to conduct while sampling prices from a distribution. For some distributions, the ideal sample size can be calculated using a straightforward one-variable optimization problem and expressed in closed form. It is assumed that a non-degenerate distribution F(p) on [0, 1] provides the distribution of prices. A consumer chooses a fixed sample size n to minimize the expected total cost C (expected purchase cost plus search cost) of purchasing the product. With n independent draws, the distribution of the lowest price is

$Fn(p)=1-[1-F(p)]n$.

Therefore, the plan of purchase outlay:

$P(n)=K\int [(1-F(p)]^n dp$

The expected price from the given distribution decreases as the number of searches increases, but the rate of decrease becomes smaller. This meets the second-order condition, and the optimal sample size (n*) satisfies the first-order condition, which states that the difference between the probability of finding the lowest price in (n*-1) searches and that of finding it in (n*) searches is greater than or equal to the search cost, which is greater than the difference between the probability of finding the lowest price in (n*) searches and that of finding it in (n*+1) searches.

$P(n^*-1)-P(n^*)\geq c> P(n^*)-P(n^*+1)$.

==== Sequential search ====
In sequential search, a consumer looks for a product or service one at a time until they find it, McCall J.J. introduced this type of search to economics. In economics, the sequential search model is used to examine how consumers choose which goods or services to purchase when they have asymmetrical information (incomplete) about those goods' quality.

Consumers in sequential search models must choose whether to stop looking for a better good or service or to buy what they have found so far. The model makes the assumption that customers have some idea of what they want and what the standard of the good or service should be. Models of sequential search have been used in many disciplines, including finance and labour economics. Sequential search models are used in labour economics to examine how employees look for work and how employers hire new employees. Sequential search models are used in the field of finance to examine how investors look for information on stocks and other financial assets.

The assumption that consumers know what they are looking for and what the standard of the product or service should be is one of the limitations of sequential search models. This presumption might not always be accurate in practical circumstances. Another drawback is that sequential search models don't account for the possibility that customers could find out more about the calibre of a good or service as they search further.

== Search from a known distribution ==
George J. Stigler proposed thinking of searching for bargains or jobs as an economically important problem. John J. McCall proposed a dynamic model of job search, based on the mathematical method of optimal stopping, on which much later work has been based. McCall's paper studied the problem of which job offers an unemployed worker should accept, and which reject, when the distribution of alternatives is known and constant, and the value of money is constant. Holding fixed job characteristics, he characterized the job search decision in terms of the reservation wage, that is, the lowest wage the worker is willing to accept. The worker's optimal strategy is simply to reject any wage offer lower than the reservation wage, and accept any wage offer higher than the reservation wage.

The reservation wage may change over time if some of the conditions assumed by McCall are not met. For example, a worker who fails to find a job might lose skills or face stigma, in which case the distribution of potential offers that worker might receive will get worse, the longer he or she is unemployed. In this case, the worker's optimal reservation wage will decline over time. Likewise, if the worker is risk averse, the reservation wage will decline over time if the worker gradually runs out of money while searching. The reservation wage would also differ for two jobs of different characteristics; that is, there will be a compensating differential between different types of jobs.

An interesting observation about McCall's model is that greater variance of offers may make the searcher better off, and prolong optimal search, even if he or she is risk averse. This is because when there is more variation in wage offers (holding fixed the mean), the searcher may want to wait longer (that is, set a higher reservation wage) in hopes of receiving an exceptionally high wage offer. The possibility of receiving some exceptionally low offers has less impact on the reservation wage, since bad offers can be turned down.

While McCall framed his theory in terms of the wage search decision of an unemployed worker, similar insights are applicable to a consumer's search for a low price. In that context, the highest price a consumer is willing to pay for a particular good is called the reservation price.

== Search from known distributions and heterogeneous costs ==
Opportunities might provide payoffs from different distributions. Costs of sampling may vary from an opportunity to another. As a result, some opportunities appear more profitable to sample than others. These problems are referred to as Pandora box problems introduced by Martin Weitzman. Boxes have different opening costs. Pandora opens boxes, but will only enjoy the best opportunity. With $x_i$ the payoff she discovered from the box $i$, $c_i$ the cost she has paid to open it and $S$ the set of boxes she has opened, Pandora receives

$$\max_{i \in S} x_i - \sum_{i \in S} c_i$$

It can be proven Pandora associates to each box a reservation value. Her optimal strategy is to open the boxes by decreasing order of reservation value until the opened box that maximizes her payoff exceed highest reservation value of the remaining boxes. This strategy is referred as the Pandora's rule.

In fact, the Pandora's rule remains the optimal sampling strategy for complex payoff functions. Wojciech Olszewski and Richard Weber show that Pandora's rule is optimal if she maximizes

$$u \left(x_1, ... ,x_S\right) - \sum_{i}^S c_i$$

for $u$ continuous, non-negative, non-decreasing, symmetric and submodular.

== Endogenizing the price distribution ==
Studying optimal search from a given distribution of prices led economists to ask why the same good should ever be sold, in equilibrium, at more than one price. After all, this is by definition a violation of the law of one price. However, when buyers do not have perfect information about where to find the lowest price (that is, whenever search is necessary), not all sellers may wish to offer the same price, because there is a trade-off between the frequency and the profitability of their sales. That is, firms may be indifferent between posting a high price (thus selling infrequently, only to those consumers with the highest reservation prices) and a low price (at which they will sell more often, because it will fall below the reservation price of more consumers).

== Search from an unknown distribution ==
When the searcher does not even know the distribution of offers, then there is an additional motive for search: by searching longer, more is learned about the range of offers available. Search from one or more unknown distributions is called a multi-armed bandit problem. The name comes from the slang term 'one-armed bandit' for a casino slot machine, and refers to the case in which the only way to learn about the distribution of rewards from a given slot machine is by actually playing that machine. Optimal search strategies for an unknown distribution have been analyzed using allocation indices such as the Gittins index.

== Matching theory ==
More recently, job search, and other types of search, have been incorporated into macroeconomic models, using a framework called 'matching theory'. Peter A. Diamond, Dale Mortensen, and Christopher A. Pissarides won the 2010 Nobel prize in economics for their work on matching theory.

In models of matching in the labor market, two types of search interact. That is, the rate at which new jobs are formed is assumed to depend both on workers' search decisions, and on firms' decisions to open job vacancies. While some matching models include a distribution of different wages, others are simplified by ignoring wage differences, and just imply that workers pass through an unemployment spell of random length before beginning work.

== See also ==
- Frictional unemployment
- Information economics
- Job hunting
- Labor economics
- Optimal stopping
- Price dispersion
- Real options analysis
- Reservation wage
- Search cost
