= Job-seeking expense tax deductions =

Income tax breaks in the United States

Generally, expenses related to the carrying-on of a business or trade are deductible from a United States taxpayer's adjusted gross income. For many taxpayers, this means that expenses related to seeking new employment, including some relevant expenses incurred for the taxpayer's education, can be deducted, resulting in a tax break, as long as certain criteria are met. On average, United States job seekers can spend upwards of $300 per month in related job-seeking services.

The Tax Cuts and Jobs Act suspended the deduction for moving expenses and job search expenses for most taxpayers for tax years beginning after December 31, 2017 through January 1, 2026. This suspension does not apply to members of the Armed Forces of the United States on active duty who move pursuant to a military order related to a permanent change of station.

First, such costs must qualify as expenses, as contemplated by the U.S. tax code, and not as capital expenditures (generally, a capital expenditure is a cost associated with producing a benefit with a useful life of more than one year, such as a long-term investment). Second, if the cost qualifies as an expense, it may be deductible if it can be characterized as an "ordinary and necessary expense paid or incurred during the taxable year in carrying on any trade or business...." For purposes of the average taxpayer looking to deduct expenses related to seeking new employment, the relevant inquiry is whether the new position sought can be deemed to be "carrying on" the prior business or trade of that taxpayer, as costs associated with starting up a new business or trade are not immediately deductible and are subject to a special form of amortization.

Whether seeking new employment, and the costs associated therewith, can be deemed as "carrying on" a prior business or trade is fact- and context-specific. However, the IRS, with approval of the courts, has insisted on a high degree of sameness between the new position sought and the previous means of employment. This means that if substantial differences exist between the duties, tasks, and activities of the taxpayer's prior job and those of the job he now seeks, then the expenses incurred will be deemed to be start-up costs, and not subject to immediate deduction. Similarly, if the taxpayer has undergone a significant hiatus between the prior position of employment and the one now sought, expenses will not be considered "carrying on" the business or trade. Again, whether a hiatus would be considered significant is highly fact- and context-specific. The relevant inquiry here should be whether there is a "substantial lack of continuity." If the taxpayer terminated his previous employment with little indication of seeking a new position in the same profession, it is likely that time spent unemployed or employed in a different field would prevent the taxpayer from claiming that he was "carrying on" his prior business or trade.

The ability to deduct the costs of seeking new employment is a distinct advantage for many taxpayers, but one likely to be overlooked. To recap, a taxpayer may only deduct the costs associated with seeking new employment when that taxpayer is searching for a new employer in substantially the same profession. Further, a significant hiatus between jobs may bar claiming this type of deduction.
