= Reservation price =

Limit on the price of a good or service

In economics, a reservation (or reserve) price is a limit on the price of a good or a service. On the demand side, it is the highest price that a buyer is willing to pay; on the supply side, it is the lowest price a seller is willing to accept for a good or service.

Reservation prices are commonly used in auctions, but the concept can be extended beyond. A party's best alternative to a negotiated agreement (BATNA), is closely related to their reservation price. Once a party determines their BATNA, they can further calculate their reservation price. In negotiations surrounding the price of a particular good or service, the reservation price is a singular number. However, this is not the only situation where reservation prices are seen. When multiple issues are being discussed, such as the size of salary and amount of benefits when applying for a new job position, the reservation price would be represented as a package, where multiple requirements need to be met.

== Description ==
In microeconomics, consumers set their reservation price as the highest price they are willing to pay for goods or a service, while sellers set the lowest price at which they would sell. Similarly, in finance, the reservation price—also called the indifference price—is the value at which an investor would be willing to buy (or sell) a financial security given his or her particular utility function.

The overlap between the reservation price of the buyer and the reservation price of the seller is often called the zone of possible agreement or the bargaining range; that is, the range of prices between which both buyer and seller would accept a deal. For example, $10 might be the lowest price a seller is willing to accept for a particular product, while a buyer might be willing to pay up to $15 for that product. The zone of possible agreement would be between $10 and $15.

Reservation prices are commonly used in auctions, where the seller may or may not make it known what the lowest acceptable price is. Buyers—especially if by proxy—may have their own reservation price at which they are unwilling to further bid. This can be seen as the "walk away" point for either party, in negotiation where the reservation price is the point beyond which a negotiator is ready to walk away from a negotiated agreement. A seller may produce a reservation demand, which is a schedule of reservation prices at which a seller would be willing to sell different quantities of a particular good.

== Analysis ==
Reservation prices vary for the buyers and sellers according to their disposable income, their desire for—or to sell—the good, and knowledge of information about substitute goods. The profile of brands and their reputation also have an impact on the reservation price of consumers. A reservation price can be used to help calculate the consumer surplus or the producer surplus with reference to the equilibrium price. The reason why consumers are able to experience a surplus is due to single pricing, which put simply is the same price being charged to every consumer at a given level of output. Some buyers are therefore paying less than what they are prepared to pay. If sellers were able to charge each buyer their individual reservation price, then price discrimination would be occurring. This would lead to higher output, but there would be an absence of consumer surplus as there is no disparity between what buyers are willing to pay and what they would actually pay. Sellers would prefer to charge using price discrimination rather than single pricing, but this would only be possible if there are no close substitutes for the good or service.

== Knowing the other party's reservation price ==
In situations where both the buyer and seller are uncertain of the other party's reservation price, generally, the two parties will 'split the difference' if their offers are apart. There are situations in negotiation however where one of the parties may know the reservation price of the other, but not vice versa. This is a case of there being incomplete information. As one party becomes more uncertain relative to the other party in terms of knowledge of each other's reservation price, the more disadvantaged that party is. Finding out the other party's reservation price is therefore important when attempting to negotiate. To assist in this, three types of information can be collected from the other party through engaging in pre-contractual conversation with them:

1. Relational information; concerned with finding out facts and beliefs regarding the relationship between the opposing party members.
2. Substantive information; about analysing the other party's offer and why they decided on that particular offer.
3. Procedural information; involves having open discussions about the negotiation process.

== Auction theory ==
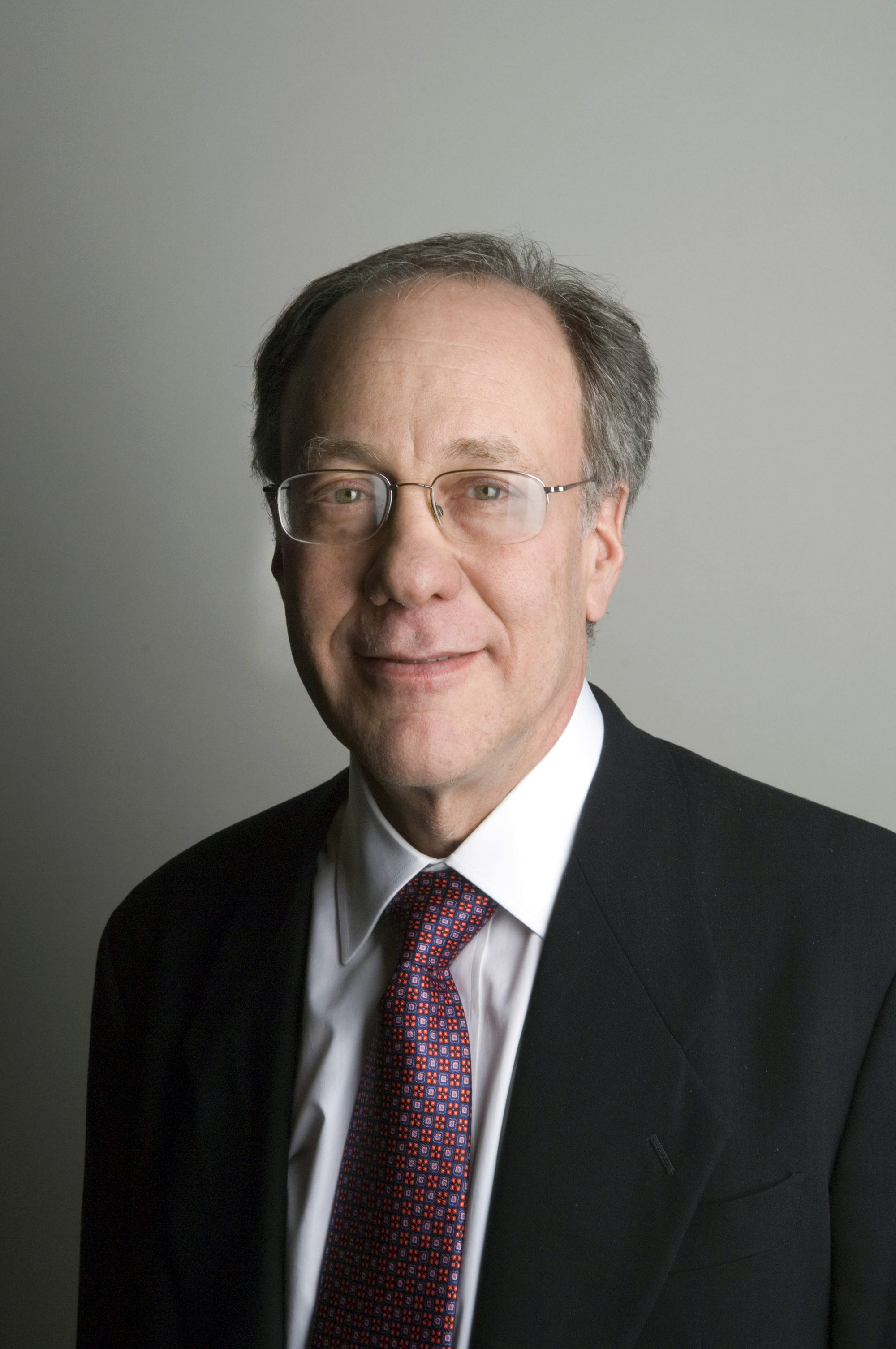
Roger Myerson, author of the paper Optimal Auction Design

In the basic model of optimal auction design developed by Roger Myerson (1981), the optimal reservation price (i.e., the smallest admissible bid) is independent of the number of bidders. This basic model of optimal auction design assumes that the bidder's type is known; that is, the seller has asked the potential buyers what their value estimates are, and the potential buyers have answered the question honestly. Myerson assumes that the bidders have private independent values, meaning that each bidder's valuation of the object to be auctioned off is a realization of a random variable observed only by the bidder, and the random variables are stochastically independent (i.e. the random variable observed by one bidder has no impact on the random variable observed by another bidder). For example, if every bidder's valuation is drawn independently from a uniform distribution on the interval [0,100], then the optimal reservation price is 50. According to traditional economic theory, the optimal reservation price results from balancing two opposing effects. First, a higher reservation price is desirable for the seller since it deters bidders from falsely claiming that they have only a small valuation. Second, a higher reservation price is undesirable for the seller since it deters bidders with truly small valuations from participating in the auction. According to behavioral economic theory, a reservation price may also have additional effects. In particular, Rosenkranz and Schmitz (2007) have argued that a reservation price can serve as a reference point when bidders have preferences as studied in prospect theory.

In a newer model of auction theory proposed by Gunay, Meng and Nagelberg (2013), different assumptions are made. Gunay, Meng and Nagelberg assume that each potential buyer has a different type, drawn from a different distribution function. That is, the bidders are asymmetric. They do not assume that the seller is aware of what type each potential buyer is. Alternatively, they assume that a specific reserve price, which does not alter based on the bidder, must be used by the seller, such as in the case of some government organisations (where price discrimination could cause legal trouble for the government organization). These assumptions are considered equivalent. This change in assumptions leads to a different outcome than was found by Myerson, in that the optimal reservation price is impacted by the number of bidders, and the optimal reserve price found when the weighted average of the virtual valuations of potential buyers is set to equal the value estimate the seller has for the object.

== See also ==
- No-reserve auction
- Reservation wage
