= Electronic markets =

Electronic markets (or electronic marketplaces) are information systems (IS) which are used by multiple separate organizational entities within one or among multiple tiers in economic value chains. In analogy to the market concept which can be viewed from a macroeconomic (describing relationships among actors in an economic systems, e.g. a monopoly) as well as from a microeconomic (describing different allocation mechanisms, e.g. public auctions of telephone frequencies) perspective, electronic markets denote networked forms of business with many possible configurations:

First, the topology of electronic markets may be centralized or decentralized in nature. Centralized electronic markets are hubs which often provide services to their participants. Decentralized settings involve sequential relationships within value chains which often are found when electronic messages are exchanged directly between businesses (electronic data interchange, EDI).

Second, the services provided by electronic markets may serve infrastructural or allocation purposes. Among the infrastructure services are routing, messaging, identification and partner directories whereas allocation services enable pricing process which in turn may be static or dynamic in nature. Typical implementations are catalogs, exchanges and auctions.

Third, the relationships of actors involved in electronic markets may be stable or atomistic in nature. The former usually refers to classical supply chains where business collaborate during a longer period of time. In the latter case, the transaction partners are only stable for a single transaction. This is usually to be found in auction and other exchange settings.

This leads to two definitions: In a narrow sense Electronic Markets are mainly conceived as allocation platforms with dynamic price discovery mechanisms involving atomistic relationships. Popular examples originate from the financial and energy industries. In a broader sense, price discovery is not critical for electronic markets. This covers all forms of electronic collaboration between organizations and consumer as well as vice versa.

== Examples ==
- company websites that serve communication and transaction purposes
- electronic purchasing systems on EDI-basis as well as based on catalogs
- systems that support the configuration of products, such as car configurators
- automated download of product information based on the scan of an article number
- activation of an emergency chain based on the monitoring of heart frequency
- websites that link consumers, such as recommendation communities

== Impacts on business efficiencies ==
Electronic markets are attributed important impacts on business efficiencies. From an industry perspective, transaction cost economics were used to illustrate the relationship between electronic markets and electronic hierarchies. While the former are in line with the narrow electronic markets definition, the latter are also included in the broader definition. This may be explained since in reality electronic markets have emerged as platforms which combine several modes of governance or types of coordination mechanisms. These “all-in-one-markets” link the possibility of competitive bidding for price discovery with the advantages of a predictable relationship to encourage relationship specific investments (non-contractible issues) and functionalities for closer collaboration. This perspective shows that it is important to distinguish between the market platform itself which creates an infrastructure between multiple parties and the coordination mechanisms operated on this platform which might be market-like or hierarchical in nature.
