= Frictional unemployment =

Type of unemployment

Frictional unemployment is a form of unemployment reflecting the gap between someone voluntarily leaving a job and finding another. As such, it is sometimes called search unemployment, though it also includes gaps in employment when transferring from one job to another.

Frictional unemployment is one of the three broad categories of unemployment, the others being structural unemployment and cyclical unemployment. Causes of frictional unemployment include better job opportunities, services, salary and wages, dissatisfaction with the previous job, and strikes by trade unions and other forms of non-unionized work actions.

== Analysis ==
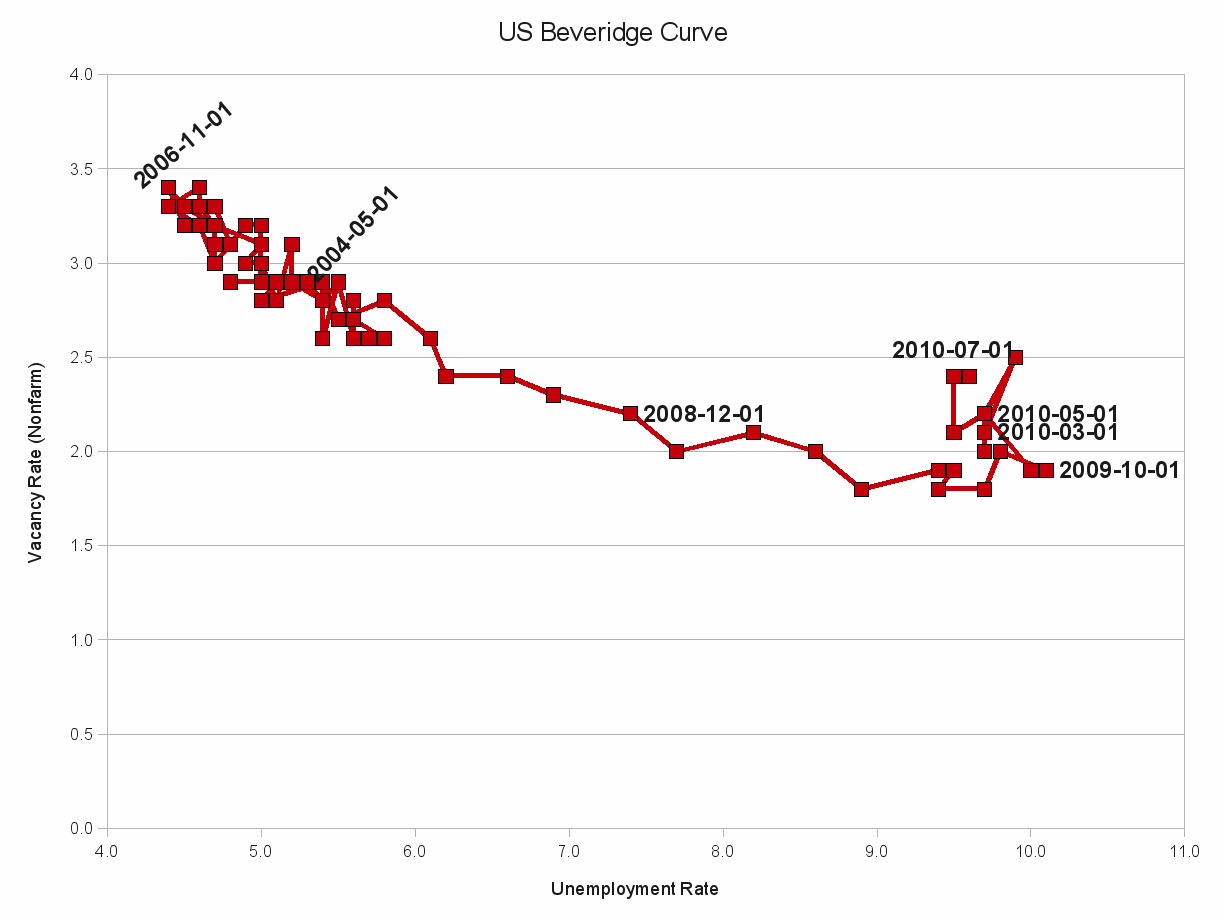
Beveridge curve of vacancy rate and unemployment rate data from the United States Bureau of Labor Statistics

Frictional unemployment exists because both jobs and workers are heterogeneous, and a mismatch can result between the characteristics of supply and demand. Such a mismatch can be related to skills, payment, worktime, location, attitude, taste, and a multitude of other factors. New entrants (such as graduating students) and re-entrants (such as former homemakers) can also suffer a spell of frictional unemployment. Workers as well as employers accept a certain level of imperfection, risk or compromise, but usually not right away; they will invest some time and effort to find a match. This is in fact beneficial to the economy since it results in a better allocation of resources. However, if the search takes too long and mismatches are too frequent, the economy suffers, since some work will not get done. Therefore, governments will seek ways to reduce unnecessary frictional unemployment.

Frictional unemployment is related to and compatible with the concept of full employment. At full employment the unemployment rate will be positive because of the inevitable presence of frictional unemployment.

The frictions in the labor market are sometimes illustrated graphically with a Beveridge curve, a downward-sloping, convex curve that shows a fixed relationship between the unemployment rate on one axis and the vacancy rate on the other. Changes in the supply of or demand for labor cause movements along this curve. An increase in labor market frictions will shift the curve outwards.

The length of gap for an average transition from one job to another can be lessened by a prosperous economy and lengthened by a constricting one; the number of those voluntarily seeking new employment opportunities may be increased by a boom and involuntarily by a recession. However, some number of people will choose to change jobs in either circumstance, establishing a minimum yet functionally ineradicable level of frictional unemployment.

== Examples ==
One kind of frictional unemployment is called wait unemployment: it refers to the effects of the existence of some sectors where employed workers are paid more than the market-clearing equilibrium wage. Not only does this restrict the amount of employment in the high-wage sector, but it attracts workers from other sectors who wait to try to get jobs there. The main problem with this theory is that such workers will likely "wait" while having jobs, so that they are not counted as unemployed. In Hollywood, for example, those who are waiting for acting jobs also wait on tables in restaurants for pay (while acting in "Equity Waiver" plays at night for no pay). However, these workers might be seen as underemployed (definition 1).

== Solutions ==
Policies to reduce frictional unemployment include:

- educational advice
- information on available jobs and workers
- combating prejudice (against certain workers, jobs or locations)
- incentives and regulations (e.g. when the frictionally unemployed receive benefits)
- relocation of industries and services
- facilities to increase availability and flexibility (e.g. daycare centers)
- aid or grants to overcome a specific obstacle (e.g. if a disabled worker is employed)
- reduction of the gap between gross and net wages (e.g. by taxing consumption instead)
- when handing out work permits (to foreigners), i.e. must stay with that company at the same work place address as stated on the work permit
