= Labour economics =

Study of the markets for wage labour

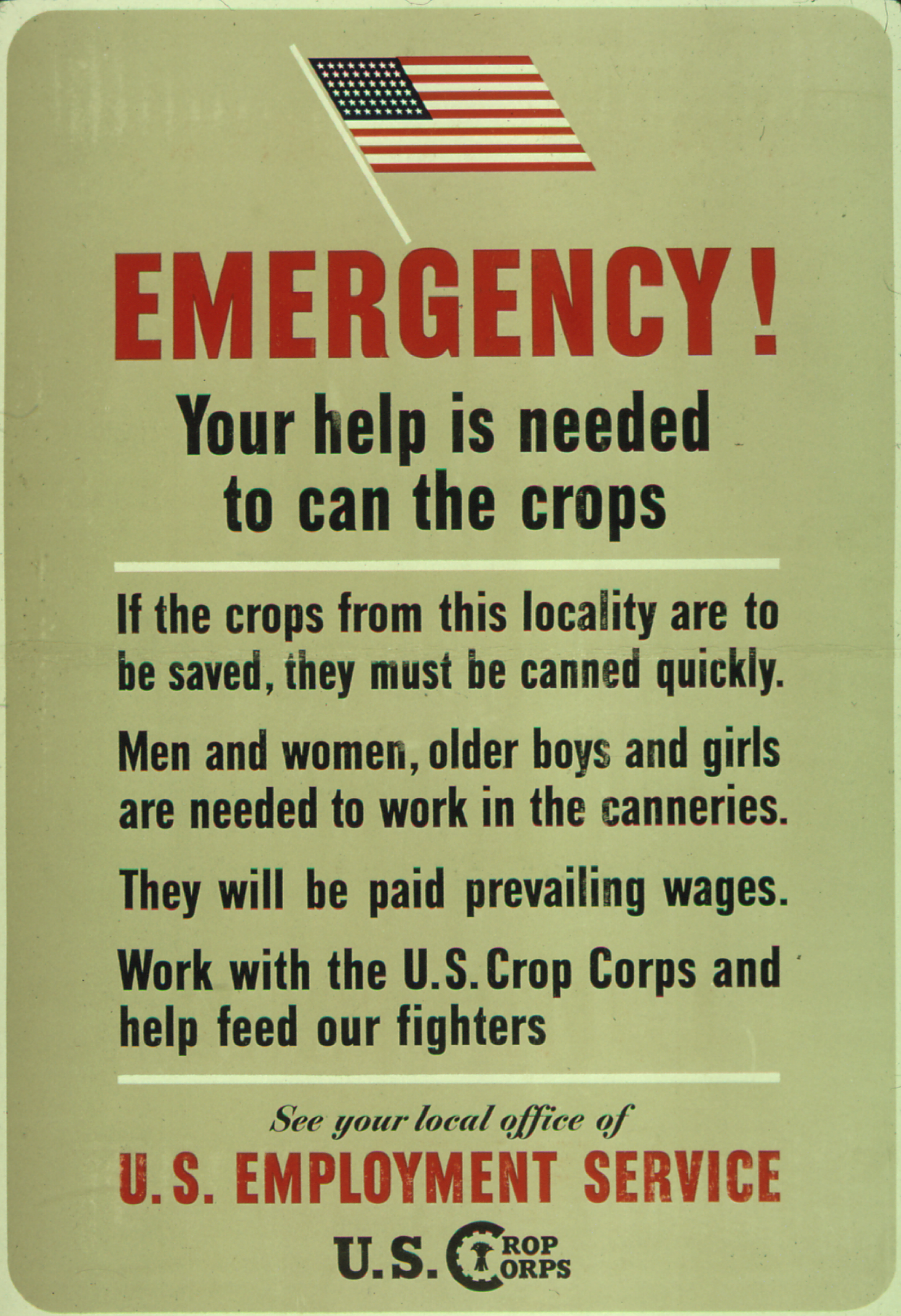
A "help wanted" sign seeks available workers for jobs.

Labour economics is the subfield of economics concerned with the study of labour as an input to economic production. Broadly, it surveys labor markets and the economic decisions of agents (i.e., workers and employers) participating in such markets.

Topics of study include the labour supply of workers and how it is affected by variables such as age, education, gender and childbearing, as well as the labour demand by firms searching for different forms of labour as an input in the production of goods and services. Other topics of study in labour economics include schooling and human capital, inequality and discrimination, collective bargaining and trade unions, technological change and unemployment, ownership and monopsony, and public policies such as unemployment benefits, pensions, health care and minimum wages.

== Macro and micro analysis of labour markets ==
Labour economics can generally be seen as the application of microeconomic or macroeconomic techniques to the labour market. A general assumption in the microeconomic study of labour markets is that workers – suppliers of labour – make rational choices based on the information that they know regarding wage, desire to provide labour, and desire for leisure, to maximise utility over their lifetime by consuming economic goods, services and leisure. Conversely, economic firms – demanders of labour – seek to maximise profits by hiring these labourers.

The labour force (LF) is defined as the number of people of working age, who are either employed or actively looking for work (unemployed). The labour force participation rate (LFPR) is the number of people in the labour force divided by the size of the adult civilian noninstitutional population (or by the population of working age that is not institutionalized), LFPR = LF/Population.

The non-labour force includes those who are not looking for work, those who are institutionalized (such as in prisons or psychiatric wards), stay-at-home spouses, children not of working age, and those serving in the military. The unemployment level is defined as the labour force minus the number of people currently employed. The unemployment rate is defined as the level of unemployment divided by the labour force. The employment rate is defined as the number of people currently employed divided by the adult population (or by the population of working age). In these statistics, self-employed people are counted as employed.

The labour market has the ability to create a higher derivative efficiency of labour, especially on a national and international level, compared to simpler forms of labour distribution, leading to a higher financial GDP growth and output. An efficient labour market is important for the private sector as it drives up derivative income through the reduction of relative costs of labour. This presupposes that division of labour is used as a method to attain cost efficiency.

Variables like employment level, unemployment level, labour force, and unfilled vacancies are called stock variables because they measure a quantity at a point in time. They can be contrasted with flow variables which measure a quantity over a duration of time. Changes in the labour force are due to flow variables such as natural population growth, net immigration, new entrants, and retirements. Changes in unemployment depend on inflows (non-employed people starting to look for jobs and employed people who lose their jobs that are looking for new ones) and outflows (people who find new employment and people who stop looking for employment). When looking at the overall macroeconomy, several types of unemployment have been identified, which can be separated into two categories of natural and unnatural unemployment.

Natural Unemployment

- Frictional unemployment – This reflects the fact that it takes time for people to find and settle into new jobs that they feel are appropriate for them and their skill set. Technological advancement often reduces frictional unemployment; for example, internet search engines have reduced the cost and time associated with finding work and hiring decisions.
- Structural unemployment – The number of jobs available in an industry is insufficient to provide jobs to all persons who are interested in working or qualified to work in that industry. This can be due to the changes in industries prevalent in a country or because wages for the industry are too high, causing people to want to supply their labour to that industry.
- Seasonal unemployment – Unemployment due to seasonal fluctuations of demand for workers across industries, such as in the retail industry after holidays that involve a lot of shopping are over.
- Natural rate of unemployment (also known as full employment) – This is the summation of frictional and structural unemployment, that excludes cyclical contributions of unemployment (e.g. recessions) and seasonal unemployment. It is the lowest rate of unemployment that a stable economy can expect to achieve, given that some frictional and structural unemployment is inevitable. Economists do not agree on the level of the natural rate, with estimates ranging from 1% to 5%, or on its meaning – some associate it with "non-accelerating inflation". The estimated rate varies between countries and across time.

Unnatural Unemployment

- Demand deficient unemployment (also known as cyclical unemployment) – Any level of unemployment beyond the natural rate caused by the failure of markets to clear, generally due to insufficient aggregate demand in the economy. During a recession, demand is deficient, causing the underutilisation of inputs (including labour).

Aggregate expenditure (AE) can be increased by increasing consumption spending (C), investment spending (I), government spending (G), or increasing exports (X), since AE = C + I + G + X.

== Supply and demand ==
Supply and demand curves with economic equilibrium

Economists view the labour market as similar to other markets in that the forces of supply and demand jointly determine the price (in this case the wage rate) and quantity (in this case the number of people employed).

Labour laws result in the labour marketed differing from other markets (like the markets for goods or the financial market) in several ways. In particular, the labour market may act as a non-clearing market. While according to neoclassical theory most markets quickly attain a point of equilibrium without excess supply or demand, this may not be true of the labour market: it may have a persistent level of unemployment. Contrasting the labour market to other markets also reveals persistent compensating differentials among similar workers.

Models that assume perfect competition in the labour market, as discussed below, conclude that workers earn their marginal product of labour.

=== Labour supply ===
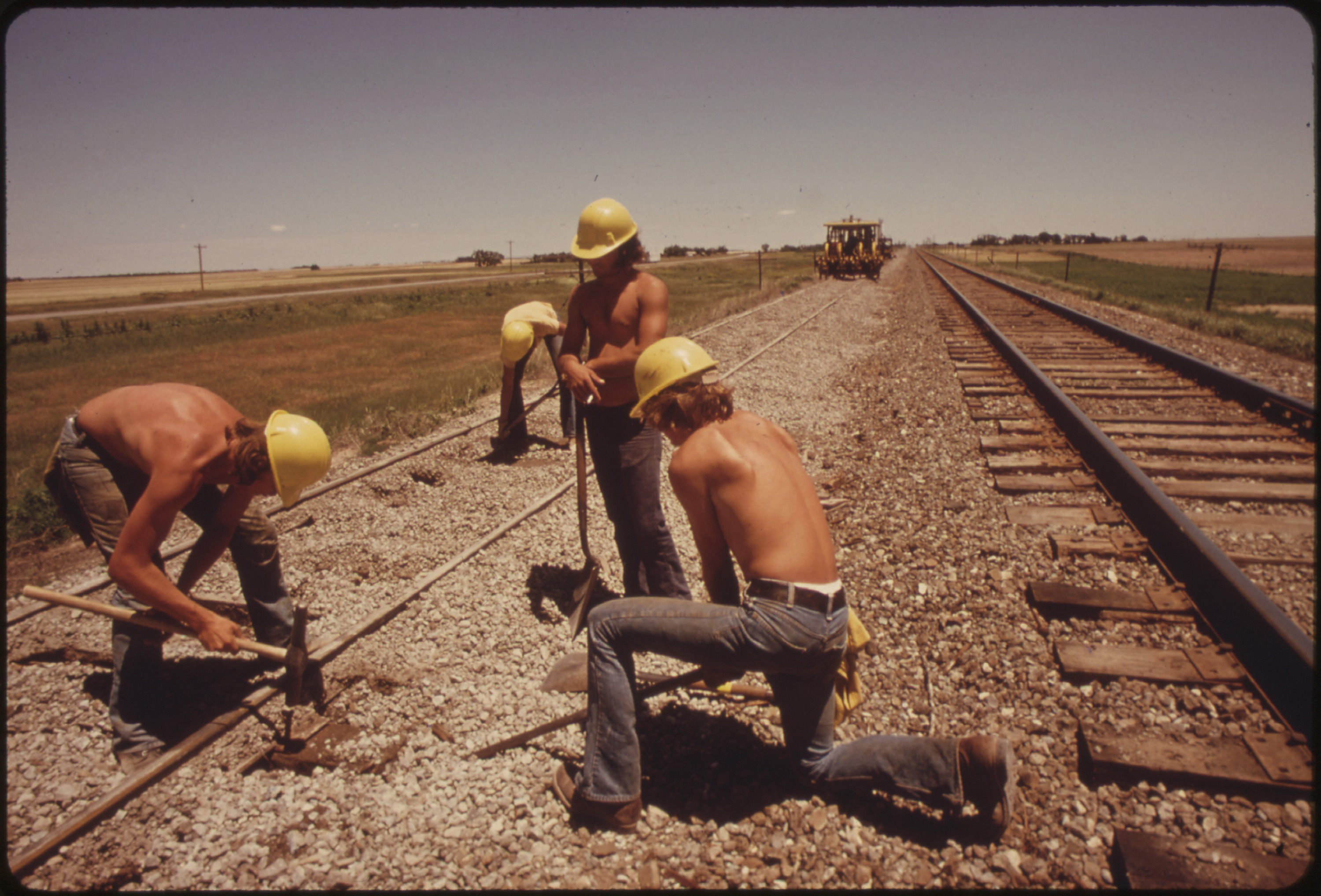
Railroad work

Households are suppliers of labour. In microeconomic theory, people are assumed to be rational and seeking to maximize their utility function. In the labour market model, their utility function expresses trade-offs in preference between leisure time and income from time used for labour. However, they are constrained by the hours available to them.

Let w denote the hourly wage, k denote total hours available for labour and leisure, L denote the chosen number of working hours, π denote income from non-labour sources, and A denote leisure hours chosen. The individual's problem is to maximise utility U, which depends on total income available for spending on consumption and also depends on the time spent in leisure, subject to a time constraint, with respect to the choices of labour time and leisure time:

$$\text{maximise} \quad U(wL + \pi, A) \quad \text{subject to} \quad L + A \le k$$

This is shown in the graph below, which illustrates the trade-off between allocating time to leisure activities and allocating it to income-generating activities. The linear constraint indicates that every additional hour of leisure undertaken requires the loss of an hour of labour and thus of the fixed amount of goods that that labour's income could purchase. Individuals must choose how much time to allocate to leisure activities and how much to working. This allocation decision is informed by the indifference curve labelled IC_{1}. The curve indicates the combinations of leisure and work that will give the individual a specific level of utility. The point where the highest indifference curve is just tangent to the constraint line (point A), illustrates the optimum for this supplier of labour services.

If consumption is measured by the value of income obtained, this diagram can be used to show a variety of interesting effects. This is because the absolute value of the slope of the budget constraint is the wage rate. The point of optimisation (point A) reflects the equivalency between the wage rate and the marginal rate of substitution of leisure for income (the absolute value of the slope of the indifference curve). Because the marginal rate of substitution of leisure for income is also the ratio of the marginal utility of leisure (MU^{L}) to the marginal utility of income (MU^{Y}), one can conclude:

$${{MU^L}\over{MU^Y}} = {{dY}\over{dL}},$$

where Y is total income and the right side is the wage rate.

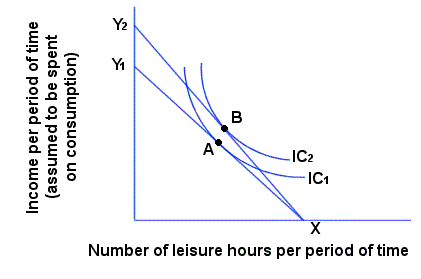
Effects of a wage increase

If the wage rate increases, this individual's constraint line pivots up from X,Y_{1} to X,Y_{2}. They can now purchase more goods and services. Their utility will increase from point A on IC_{1} to point B on IC_{2}. To understand what effect this might have on the decision of how many hours to work, one must look at the income effect and substitution effect.

The wage increase shown in the previous diagram can be decomposed into two separate effects. The pure income effect is shown as the movement from point A to point C in the next diagram. Consumption increases from Y_{A} to Y_{C} and – since the diagram assumes that leisure is a normal good – leisure time increases from X_{A} to X_{C}. (Employment time decreases by the same amount as leisure increases.)

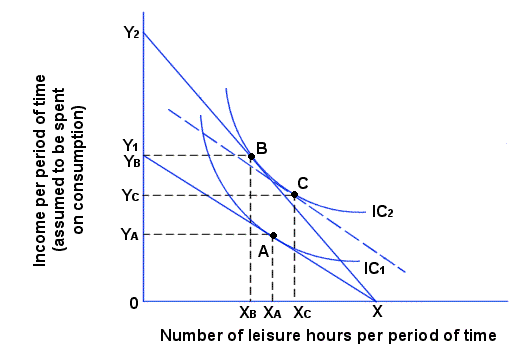
The Income and Substitution effects of a wage increase

But that is only part of the picture. As the wage rate rises, the worker will substitute away from leisure and into the provision of labour—that is, will work more hours to take advantage of the higher wage rate, or in other words substitute away from leisure because of its higher opportunity cost. This substitution effect is represented by the shift from point C to point B. The net impact of these two effects is shown by the shift from point A to point B. The relative magnitude of the two effects depends on the circumstances. In some cases, such as the one shown, the substitution effect is greater than the income effect (in which case more time will be allocated to working), but in other cases, the income effect will be greater than the substitution effect (in which case less time is allocated to working). The intuition behind this latter case is that the individual decides that the higher earnings on the previous amount of labour can be "spent" by purchasing more leisure.

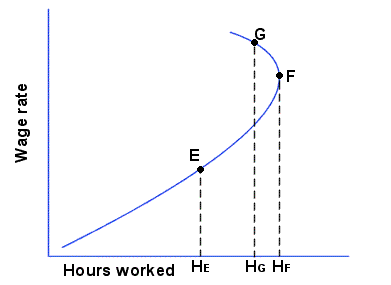
The Labour Supply curve

If the substitution effect is greater than the income effect, an individual's supply of labour services will increase as the wage rate rises, which is represented by a positive slope in the labour supply curve (as at point E in the adjacent diagram, which exhibits a positive wage elasticity). This positive relationship is increasing until point F, beyond which the income effect dominates the substitution effect and the individual starts to reduce the number of labour hours they supply (point G) as wage increases; in other words, the wage elasticity is now negative.

The direction of the slope may change more than once for some individuals, and the labour supply curve is different for different individuals.

Other variables that affect the labour supply decision, and can be readily incorporated into the model, include taxation, welfare, work environment, and income as a signal of ability or social contribution.

=== Labour demand ===
A firm's labour demand is based on its marginal physical product of labour (MPP_{L}). This is defined as the additional output (or physical product) that results from an increase of one unit of labour (or from an infinitesimal increase in labour). (See also Production theory basics.)

Labour demand is a derived demand; that is, hiring labour is not desired for its own sake but rather because it aids in producing output, which contributes to an employer's revenue and hence profits. The demand for an additional amount of labour depends on the Marginal Revenue Product (MRP) and the marginal cost (MC) of the worker. With a perfectly competitive goods market, the MRP is calculated by multiplying the price of the end product or service by the Marginal Physical Product of the worker. If the MRP is greater than a firm's Marginal Cost, then the firm will employ the worker since doing so will increase profit. The firm only employs however up to the point where MRP=MC, and not beyond, in neoclassical economic theory.

The MRP of the worker is affected by other inputs to production with which the worker can work (e.g. machinery), often aggregated under the term "capital". It is typical in economic models for greater availability of capital for a firm to increase the MRP of the worker, all else equal. Education and training are counted as "human capital". Since the amount of physical capital affects MRP, and since financial capital flows can affect the amount of physical capital available, MRP and thus wages can be affected by financial capital flows within and between countries, and the degree of capital mobility within and between countries.

According to neoclassical theory, over the relevant range of outputs, the marginal physical product of labour is declining (law of diminishing returns). That is, as more and more units of labour are employed, their additional output begins to decline.

Additionally, although the MRP is a good way of expressing an employer's demand, other factors such as social group formation can the demand, as well as the labour supply. This constantly restructures exactly what a labour market is, and leads way to cause problems for theories of inflation.

=== Equilibrium ===
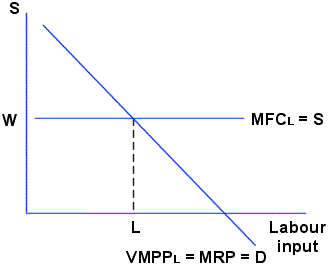
A firm's labour demand in the short run (D) and a horizontal supply curve (S)

The marginal revenue product of labour can be used as the demand for labour curve for this firm in the short run. In competitive markets, a firm faces a perfectly elastic supply of labour which corresponds with the wage rate and the marginal resource cost of labour (W = S_{L} = MFC_{L}). In imperfect markets, the diagram would have to be adjusted because MFC_{L} would then be equal to the wage rate divided by marginal costs. Because optimum resource allocation requires that marginal factor costs equal marginal revenue product, this firm would demand L units of labour as shown in the diagram.

The demand for labour of this firm can be summed with the demand for labour of all other firms in the economy to obtain the aggregate demand for labour. Likewise, the supply curves of all the individual workers (mentioned above) can be summed to obtain the aggregate supply of labour. These supply and demand curves can be analysed in the same way as any other industry demand and supply curves to determine equilibrium wage and employment levels.

Wage differences exist, particularly in mixed and fully/partly flexible labour markets. For example, the wages of a doctor and a port cleaner, both employed by the NHS, differ greatly. There are various factors concerning this phenomenon. This includes the MRP of the worker. A doctor's MRP is far greater than that of the port cleaner. In addition, the barriers to becoming a doctor are far greater than that of becoming a port cleaner. To become a doctor takes a lot of education and training which is costly, and only those who excel in academia can succeed in becoming doctors. The port cleaner, however, requires relatively less training. The supply of doctors is therefore significantly less elastic than that of port cleaners. Demand is also inelastic as there is a high demand for doctors and medical care is a necessity, so the NHS will pay higher wage rates to attract the profession.

== Monopsony and oligopsony ==
Real-world labour markets exhibit imperfect competition, under which the above neoclassical model fails and thus labour markets may be inefficient. In such cases, labour markets may have a small number of employers who thus have disproportionate power over employment and wage-setting. These firms constitute an "oligopsony", and generate an "oligopsonistic" labour market.

In the extreme case, there may be only one employer. This firm is called a "monopsony" and generates a "monopsonistic" labour market. Some economists apply the terms monopsony and monopsonistic to both oligopsonistic and pure monopsonistic situations to broadly illustrate the concept of a concentrated labour market (in the sense of there being few employers).

In equilibrium, oligopsonies and monopsonies generally produce lower employment and lower wages than does an idealised, perfectly competitive labour market. This can produce socially undesirable outcomes, such as poverty, unemployment, underinvestment in human capital, regional and social inequalities, regulatory capture, barriers to entry and weak innovation.

Labour economists studying oligopsony and monopsony may focus on topics such as company towns, geographic mobility, minimum wages, tax incidence, non-compete clauses, search frictions, unionisation and collective bargaining agreements, wage discrimination, and cartel theory.

== Asymmetric information ==
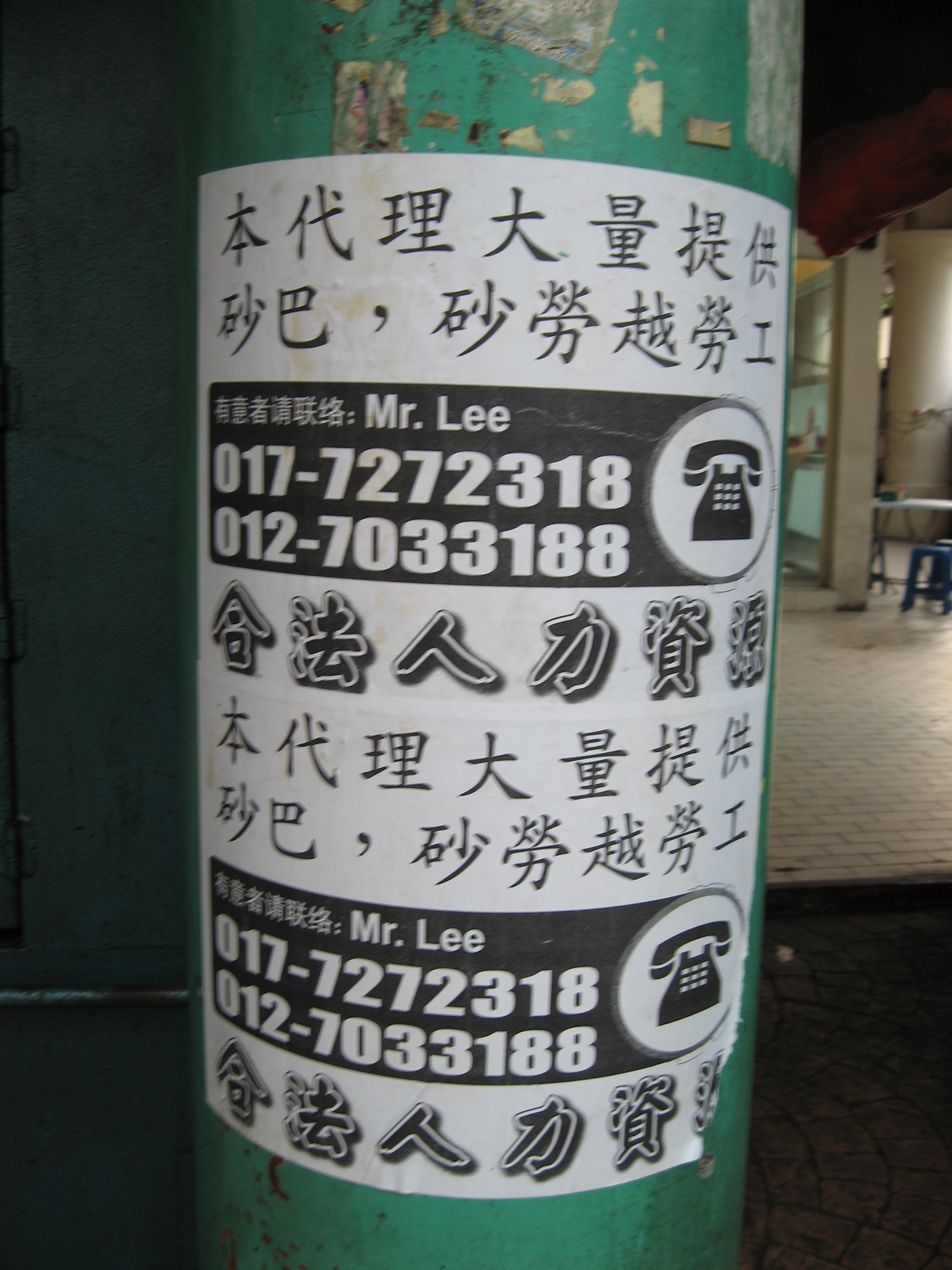
An advertisement for labour from Sabah and Sarawak, seen in Jalan Petaling, Kuala Lumpur

In many real-life situations, the assumption of perfect information is unrealistic. An employer does not necessarily know how hard workers are working or how productive they are. This provides an incentive for workers to shirk from providing their full effort, called moral hazard. Since it is difficult for the employer to identify the hard-working and the shirking employees, there is no incentive to work hard and productivity falls overall, leading to the hiring of more workers and a lower unemployment rate.

One solution that is used to avoid a moral hazard is stock options that grant employees the chance to benefit directly from a firm's success. However, this solution has attracted criticism as executives with large stock-option packages have been suspected of acting to over-inflate share values to the detriment of the long-run welfare of the firm. Another solution, foreshadowed by the rise of temporary workers in Japan and the firing of many of these workers in response to the 2008 financial crisis, is more flexible job- contracts and -terms that encourage employees to work less than full-time by partially compensating for the loss of hours, relying on workers to adapt their working time in response to job requirements and economic conditions instead of the employer trying to determine how much work is needed to complete a given task and overestimating.

Another aspect of uncertainty results from the firm's imperfect knowledge about worker ability. If a firm is unsure about a worker's ability, it pays a wage assuming that the worker's ability is the average of similar workers. This wage under compensates high-ability workers which may drive them away from the labour market as well as at the same time attracting low-ability workers. Such a phenomenon, called adverse selection, can sometimes lead to market collapse.

One way to combat adverse selection, firms will try to use signalling, pioneered by Michael Spence, whereby employers could use various characteristics of applicants differentiate between high-ability or low-ability workers. One common signal used is education, whereby employers assume that high-ability workers will have higher levels of education. Employers can then compensate high-ability workers with higher wages. However, signalling does not always work, and it may appear to an external observer that education has raised the marginal product of labour, without this necessarily being true.

=== Search models ===
One of the major research achievements of the 1990–2010 period was the development of a framework with dynamic search, matching, and bargaining.

== Personnel economics: hiring and incentives ==
At the micro level, one sub-discipline eliciting increased attention in recent decades is analysis of internal labour markets, that is, within firms (or other organisations), studied in personnel economics from the perspective of personnel management. By contrast, external labour markets "imply that workers move somewhat fluidly between firms and wages are determined by some aggregate process where firms do not have significant discretion over wage setting." The focus is on "how firms establish, maintain, and end employment relationships and on how firms provide incentives to employees," including models and empirical work on incentive systems and as constrained by economic efficiency and risk/incentive tradeoffs relating to personnel compensation.

=== Discrimination and inequality ===
Inequality and discrimination in the workplace can have many effects on workers.

In the context of labour economics, inequality is usually referring to the unequal distribution of earning between households. Inequality is commonly measured by economists using the Gini coefficient. Over time, inequality has, on average, been increasing. This is due to numerous factors including labour supply and demand shifts as well as institutional changes in the labour market. On the shifts in labour supply and demand, factors include demand for skilled workers going up more than the supply of skilled workers and relative to unskilled workers as well as technological changes that increase productivity; all of these things cause wages to go up for skilled labour while unskilled worker wages stay the same or decline. As for the institutional changes, a decrease in union power and a declining real minimum wage, which both reduce unskilled workers wages, and tax cuts for the wealthy all increase the inequality gap between groups of earners.

As for discrimination, it is the difference in pay that can be attributed to the demographic differences between people, such as gender, race, ethnicity, religion, sexual orientation, etc., even though these factors do not affect the productivity of the worker. Many regions and countries have enacted government policies to combat discrimination, including discrimination in the workplace. Discrimination can be modelled and measured in numerous ways. The Oaxaca decomposition is a common method to calculate the amount of discrimination that exists when wages differ between groups of people. This decomposition aims to calculate the difference in wages that occurs because of differences in skills versus the returns to those skills. A way of modelling discrimination in the workplace when dealing with wages are Gary Becker's taste models. Using taste models, employer discrimination can be thought of as the employer not hiring the minority worker because of their perceived cost of hiring that worker is higher than that of the cost of hiring a non-minority worker, which causes less hiring of the minority. Another taste model is for employee discrimination, which does not cause a decline in the hiring of minorities, but instead causes a more segregated workforce because the prejudiced worker feels that they should be paid more to work next to the worker they are prejudiced against or that they are not paid an equal amount as the worker they are prejudiced against. One more taste model involves customer discrimination, whereby the employers themselves are not prejudiced but believe that their customers might be, so therefore the employer is less likely to hire the minority worker if they are going to interact with customers that are prejudiced. There are many other taste models other than these that Gary Becker has made to explain discrimination that causes differences in hiring in wages in the labour market.

Differences in employer payroll taxes tend to result in preferential hiring.

== See also ==
- Affective labour
- Beveridge curve
- Consumer theory
- Conditional factor demands
- Career and Life Planning Education
- Collective bargaining
- Cost the limit of price
- Demographic economics
- Employment
  - Unemployment
  - Employment Protection Legislation
  - Compensation of employees
  - Employment-to-population ratio
- Economic rent
- Global labor arbitrage
  - Offshore outsourcing
- Housework
- Human resources
  - Human Resource Management Systems
- Income tax
- Industrial relations
- Labour market flexibility
- Labour power
- Manual labour
- Median income
- Price elasticity of demand
- Price elasticity of supply
  - Frisch elasticity of labor supply
- Salary inversion
- Volunteer
- Unfree labour

== Sources ==
- Thompson, E. P. (1966). The Making of the English Working Class (reprinted ed.). New York City: Vintage Books. ISBN 9780394703220.
