= Ruth Lorenzo discography =

Discography of Spanish singer and composer

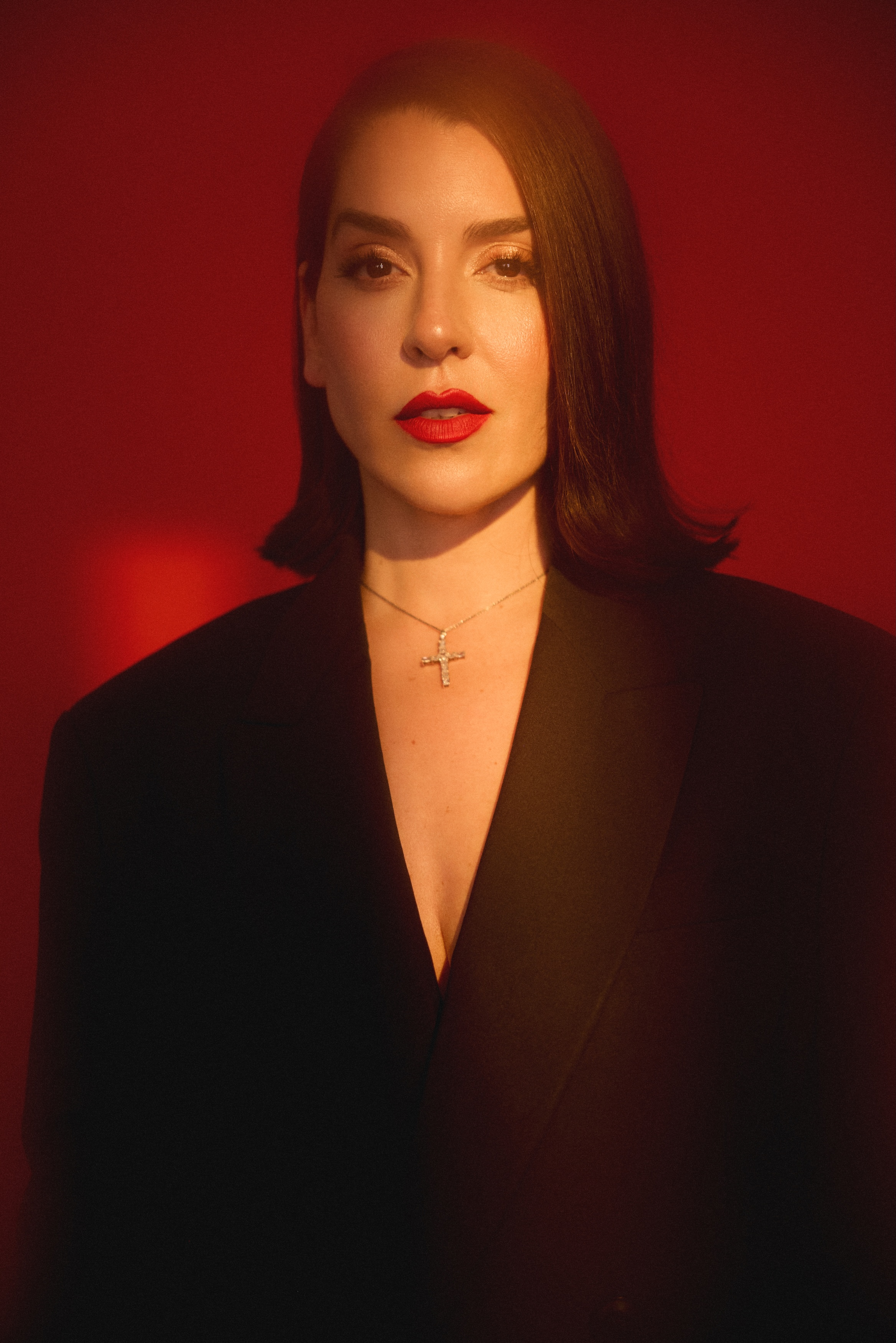
- Ruth Lorenzo 2025
- Studio albums: 2
- EPs: 5
- Singles: 9
- Promotional singles: 5
- Featured singles: 3

Ruth Lorenzo is a Spanish singer and composer. She rose to fame coming fifth in the fifth series of the British TV talent show The X Factor in 2008. Her discography consists of two studio albums, five extended plays, seven singles as a lead artist and three singles as a featured artist. She released her debut single "Burn" on 27 June 2011, the song peaked to number 16 on the Spanish Singles Chart. The song is a cover originally sung by London-based singer Caiyo (aka Francis Rodino) from his 2009 album Circles and Squares.

Her debut studio album Planeta Azul, was released in October 2014, peaking at number 3 on the Spanish Albums Chart. "Dancing in the Rain" was released as the lead single from the album on 18 February 2014; the song peaked at number 5 on the Spanish Singles Chart. It was chosen to represent Spain at the Eurovision Song Contest 2014 in Denmark, where it placed 9th with 74 points. "Gigantes" was released as the second single from the album on 7 October 2014, peaking at number 6 in Spain. "Renuncio" was released as the third single from the album on 17 February 2015, and reached number 49 in Spain. "99" was released as the lead single from the special edition of the album on 17 February 2015.

Loveaholic is the title of her second studio album, including songs such as "Good Girls Don't Lie", "My Last Song", "Loveaholic" or "Bring Back the New", among others. The album includes "Another day" a collaboration with acclaimed guitarist Jeff Beck.

== Studio albums ==
Title	Details	Peak chart positions
Title	Details	SPA
Planeta Azul	Released: 27 October 2014; Re-released: 16 October 2015; Formats: CD, digital download; Label: Roster Music	3
Loveaholic	Released: 9 March 2018; Formats: CD, digital download; Label: Raspberry Records	9

== Extended plays ==
Title	Details
Burn	Released: 27 June 2011; Format: Digital download
The Night	Released: 16 June 2013; Format: Digital download; Label: H&I Music Ltd
Love Is Dead	Released: 1 December 2013; Format: Digital download; Label: H&I Music Ltd
Dancing in the Rain (Cahill Remixes)	Released: 10 June 2014; Format: Digital download; Label: Roster Music
Renuncio (Remixes)	Released: 17 February 2015; Format: Digital download; Label: Roster Music

== Singles ==
=== As lead artist ===
Title	Year	Peak chart positions						Album
Title	Year	SPA	AUT	GER	IRE	SWI	UK	Album
"Burn"	2011	16	—	—	—	—	—	Non-album singles
"The Night"	2013	—	—	—	—	—	—	Non-album singles
"Love Is Dead"	2013	—	—	—	—	—	—	Non-album singles
"Dancing in the Rain"	2014	5	69	54	75	69	100	Planeta Azul
"Gigantes"	2014	6	—	—	—	—	—	Planeta Azul
"Renuncio"	2015	49	—	—	—	—	—	Planeta Azul
"99"	2015	—	—	—	—	—	—	Planeta Azul
"Voces"	2016	52	—	—	—	—	—	Non-album single
"Good Girls Don't Lie"	2017	—	—	—	—	—	—	Loveaholic
"Underworld"	2019	—	—	—	—	—	—	Non-album single
"Miedo"	2020	—	—	—	—	—	—	Crisálida
"Crisálida"	2021	—	—	—	—	—	—	Crisálida
"El Mismo Puñal" (with Rayden)	2021	—	—	—	—	—	—	Crisálida
"—" denotes a single that did not chart or was not released.

=== As featured artist ===
Title	Year	Peak chart positions		Album
Title	Year	IRE	UK	Album
"Hero" (with The X Factor Finalists)	2008	1	1	Charity single
"Fall to Fly" (with The Osmonds and Sophia Osmond)	2012	—	—	Can't Get There Without You
"Tribal" (with Jeff Beck)	2015	—	—	Jeff Beck Live+
"El fantasma de la ópera" (with Daniel Diges)	2015	—	—	Calle Broadway
"—" denotes a single that did not chart or was not released.

=== Promotional Singles ===
Title	Year	Album
"Planeta Azul"	2014	Planeta Azul
"Flamingos"	2015	Planeta Azul
"Patito Feo"	2015	Planeta Azul
"Te Veo"	2015	Planeta Azul
"Echo"	2015	Planeta Azul
"My Last Song"	2018	Loveaholic
"Loveaholic"	2018	Loveaholic
"Bring Back the New"	2018	Loveaholic

== Soundtracks ==
Title	Year	Album
"Quiero Ser Valiente"	2010	Valientes
"Te Puedo Ver"	2010	Valientes
"Hechicero"	2014	Juan Mariné, La Aventura De Hacer Cine
"Mi Gran Noche" (with Roko)	2015	Cámbiame Premium
