= 99th =

99th is the ordinal form of the number 99. 99th or Ninety-ninth may also refer to:

- A fraction, 1/99, equal to one of 99 equal parts
- 99th Precinct, fictional police precinct in the TV series Brooklyn Nine-Nine

== Geography ==
- 99th meridian east, a line of longitude
- 99th meridian west, a line of longitude
- 99th Street (disambiguation)

== Military ==
- 99th Brigade (disambiguation)
- 99th Division (disambiguation)
- 99th Regiment (disambiguation)
- 99th Squadron (disambiguation)

== Other ==
- 99th century
- 99th century BC

== See also ==
- 99 (disambiguation)
- April 9, 99th day of the year in a standard year
