= 99 =

99 may refer to:

- 99 (number), the natural number following 98 and preceding 100
- one of the years 99 BC, AD 99, 1999, 2099, etc.

== Art, entertainment, and media ==
=== Film, television and radio ===
- Agent 99 in the TV series Get Smart and various spinoffs
- 99 (1918 film), a Hungarian film
- 99 (2009 film), an Indian Hindi film
- 99 (2019 film), an Indian Kannada film
- The 99 (TV series), a 2011–2012 animated series
- WNNX (99X), classic "Rock 100.5" FM, in Atlanta, Georgia
- 99 (Brooklyn Nine-Nine), an episode of Brooklyn Nine-Nine
- 99, a character from Star Wars: The Clone Wars
  - Clone Force 99, also called "The Bad Batch" and the eponymous animated series (named after the character in-universe)

=== Games ===
- '99: The Last War, a renamed version of the arcade game Repulse
- Ninety-nine (addition card game), a simple card game where players drop out if forced to bring the total above 99
- Ninety-nine (trick-taking card game), a card game where players bid by discarding three cards
- 9-Nine, a Japanese visual novel
- 99, the video game series that features battle royale games such as Tetris 99, F-Zero 99, and Pac-Man 99.

=== Music ===
- 99 Records, a record label

==== Performers ====
- Ninety-nine (comedy duo), a Japanese comedic duo known for their show Mecha-Mecha Iketeru!
- ninetynine, an Australian indie band
- 9nine, a Japanese idol J-Pop group

==== Albums ====
- 99 (Epik High album), 2012
- 99 (No-Big-Silence album), 1997
- Ninety Nine (album) by The Angels, 2024
- #99, by Moka Only, 2016

==== Songs ====
- "99" (song), 1979, by Toto
- "99" (Fightstar song), 2007
- "99" (Ruth Lorenzo song), 2015
- "99", 2004, by The Haunted from the album rEVOLVEr
- "Ninety-Nine" (song), 1959 by Bill Anderson

== Commercial brands ==
- 99, a line of schnapps fruit brandy produced by Barton Brands
- 99 (app), a brand of mobile transport software
- 99, a soft-serve ice cream cone served with a chocolate flake
- Ninety Nine (restaurant chain), a regional casual dining chain in the United States

== Other uses ==
- .99, a common price ending in psychological pricing
- Ninety-Nines, an organization for female pilots founded by Amelia Earhart and others
- 99 Dike, a main-belt asteroid
- Saab 99, a compact executive car
- 99 Names of God in Islam
- 99 "Reinterpretations of The Drover's Wives" by Henry Lawson

== See also ==
- 99% (disambiguation)
- 99ers, U.S. Citizens who have exhausted all their unemployment benefits
- 99ers, the 1999 U.S. Women's soccer team
- 99th (disambiguation)
- 99X (disambiguation)
- A99 (disambiguation)
- List of highways numbered 99
- Atomic number 99: einsteinium
