= 99th Division =

In military terms, 99th Division or 99th Infantry Division may refer to:

== Infantry divisions ==
- 99th Division (1st Formation) (People's Republic of China)
- 99th Division (2nd Formation) (People's Republic of China)
- 99th Light Infantry Division, Wehrmacht, Germany
- 99th Infantry Division (Israel)
- 99th Guards Rifle Division, Soviet Union
- 99th Rifle Division, Soviet Union
- 99th Infantry Division (United States)

== See also ==
- List of military divisions by number
- 99th Brigade (disambiguation)
- 99th Regiment (disambiguation)
- 99th Squadron (disambiguation)
