= 99ers (disambiguation) =

99ers is a colloquial term for unemployed people in the United States who have exhausted their unemployment benefits. It may also refer to:

- 99ers, nickname for the members of the United States women's national soccer team who won the 1999 FIFA Women's World Cup
- Brantford 99ers, an ice hockey team in Ontario, Canada
- Graz 99ers, an ice hockey team in Austria
- RheinStars Köln (formerly Köln 99ers), an ice hockey team in Cologne, Germany

== See also ==
- 99 (disambiguation)
