= Planeta Azul =

- Cover to the standard edition; the special edition features a photo of Lorenzo floating in water

Studio album by Ruth Lorenzo
- Released: 27 October 2014
- Recorded: 2014
- Genre: Pop; electropop; rock; rock en Español
- Label: Roster Music
- Producer: Chris Wahle

Ruth Lorenzo chronology
Planeta Azul (2014)	Loveaholic (2018)

Singles from Planeta Azul
- 1. "Dancing in the Rain" Released: 18 February 2014; 2. "Gigantes" Released: 7 October 2014; 3. "Renuncio" Released: 17 February 2015; 4. "99" Released: 28 August 2015

Planeta Azul (English: Blue Planet) is the debut album by Spanish singer Ruth Lorenzo. It was released on 27 October 2014 by Roster Music. The album was preceded by singles "Dancing in the Rain", which represented Spain in the Eurovision Song Contest 2014 in Denmark, and "Gigantes". Renuncio was released as the third single in February 2015. Lorenzo has released a lot of lyric videos and videoclips (including "Flamingos" and "Patito Feo") to promote the album, too.

The Special Edition of the album was released in October 2015, one year later and peaked at number 3 on the official Spanish Charts.

== Promotion ==
=== Gira Planeta Azul ===
On 3 August 2015, Lorenzo made an announcement in Spain that she would embark on her very first solo tour in October 2015.

Gira Planeta Azul
- Tour by Ruth Lorenzo
- Associated album: Planeta Azul
- Start date: 30 October 2015
- End date: 23 December 2015
- No. of shows: 11

Date	City	Country	Venue
30 October 2015	Zaragoza	Spain	Teatro de las Esquinas
6 November 2015	Cartagena	Spain	Auditorio el Batel
13 November 2015	Santander	Spain	Escenario Santander
20 November 2015	Sevilla	Spain	Sala Custom
27 November 2015	Málaga	Spain	Sala París 15
28 November 2015	Alicante	Spain	Sala The One
29 November 2015	Valencia	Spain	Sala Rockcity
12 December 2015	Barcelona	Spain	Sala Music Hall
13 December 2015	Madrid	Spain	Sala Shoko
19 December 2015	Granada	Spain	Sala El Tren
23 December 2015	Murcia	Spain	Teatro Circo

=== Cancelled shows ===
List of cancelled concerts, showing date, city, country, venue, and reason for cancellation
Date	City	Country	Venue	Reason
18 December 2015	Valladolid	Spain	Sala Porta Caeli	Illness

Setlist
- Act 1

Intro

1. «Noche en Blanco»
2. «Planeta Azul»
3. «Flamingos»
4. «99»
5. «Vulnerable»
6. «Eva»
- Act 2 - Acustic Set
7. «Hallelujah» (Leonard Cohen)
8. «The Edge of Glory» (Lady Gaga)
9. «Diamond Doors»
- Act 3
10. «Dancing in the Rain»
11. «Patito Feo»
12. «Gigantes»
13. «Te Veo»
- Act 4
14. «Royals» (Lorde)
15. «Renuncio»
16. «Echo»

== Singles ==
"Dancing in the Rain" was released as the lead single from the album on 18 February 2014. "Gigantes" was released as the second single from the album on 7 October 2014. "Renuncio" was released as the third single from the album on 17 February 2015. "99" was released as the lead single of the Special Edition and fourth overall on 28 August 2015.

== Track listing ==
Standard edition
No.	Title	Length
1.	"Planeta Azul" (Blue Planet)	3:09
2.	"Gigantes" (Giants)	3:36
3.	"Noche En Blanco" (Night in White)	3:03
4.	"Parar el Tiempo" (Stop the Time)	3:36
5.	"Renuncio" (I Quit)	3:47
6.	"Rey De Corazones (with Miguel Poveda)" (King of Hearts)	3:53
7.	"Vulnerable"	3:38
8.	"1, 2, 3"	3:46
9.	"Inevitable" (Unavoidable)	3:12
10.	"Patito Feo" (Ugly Duckling)	3:37
11.	"Flamingos"	3:23
12.	"Eva"	4:18
13.	"Te Veo" (I See You)	3:53
14.	"Dancing in the Rain"	2:52
15.	"Renuncio" (Acoustic version)	3:35
16.	"Gigantes" (Acoustic version)	3:26

Special edition
No.	Title	Length
1.	"Planeta Azul" (Blue Planet)	3:09
2.	"99"	3:32
3.	"Echo"	3:06
4.	"Gigantes" (Giants)	3:36
5.	"Noche En Blanco" (Night in White)	3:03
6.	"Renuncio" (I Quit)	3:47
7.	"Diamond Doors"	4:15
8.	"Rey De Corazones (with Miguel Poveda)" (King of Hearts)	3:53
9.	"Vulnerable"	3:38
10.	"Parar El tiempo" (Stop the Time)	3:36
11.	"Inevitable (with Xuso Jones)" (Unavoidable)	3:11
12.	"Patito Feo" (Ugly Duckling)	3:37
13.	"Flamingos"	3:23
14.	"Impossible"	3:48
15.	"Eva"	4:18
16.	"Te Veo" (I See You)	3:53
17.	"London"	3:49
18.	"Unbreakable"	3:37
19.	"Flamingos (English version)"	3:23
20.	"Dancing in the Rain"	2:52

== Charts ==
Chart (2014)	Peak position
Spanish Albums (PROMUSICAE)	3

== Release history ==
Region	Date	Version	Format	Label
Spain	27 October 2014	Standard	Digital download, CD	Roster Music
Spain	16 October 2015	Special Edition	Digital download, CD	Roster Music
