= 9X =

9X or 9-X may also refer to:

- 9x, or nine times in multiplication
- 9X Generation, a Vietnamese term for people born during the 1990s
- Windows 9x, a generation of Microsoft Windows
- 9X (TV channel), an Indian Hindi general entertainment channel
- 9X Media
- New York State Route 9X
- Saab 9-X
  - Saab 9-X Biohybrid
- AIM-9X, a model of AIM-9 Sidewinder
- Southern Airways Express (IATA code)

== See also ==
- X9 (disambiguation)
- X (disambiguation)
- 9 (disambiguation)
- 99X (disambiguation)
