= Rupert Deering =

Norfolk Island penal colony administrator

Captain Rupert Deering, soldier and penal administrator of the 99th Regiment, was Commandant of the second convict settlement at Norfolk Island. His tenure lasted from the departure of John Price in January 1853 to September of the same year.

During his time, the settlement was being wound down. Prisoners, guards, and civil officers and their families were moved to Port Arthur in Van Diemen's Land, present day Tasmania.

There was one last event of convict defiance when, in March 1853, some convicts seized a government launch and attempted to row to freedom. In July, news was received that the launch had reached the coast of New South Wales and some of the runaways had been captured.
