= List of highways numbered 99 =

== International ==
- E99 European route E99

== Australia ==
- Springbrook Road, Queensland

== Canada ==
- British Columbia Highway 99
- Ontario Highway 99 (former)
- Saskatchewan Highway 99

== China ==
- G99 Expressway

== Greece ==
- EO99 road

== India ==
- National Highway 99 (India)

== Iran ==
- Road 99

== Israel ==
- Highway 99 (Israel)

== New Zealand ==
- New Zealand State Highway 99

== Poland ==
- National road 99 (former; 1986–2000)

== United States ==
- Interstate 99
- U.S. Route 99 (former)
  - U.S. Route 99T (former)
- Alabama State Route 99
  - County Route 99 (Lee County, Alabama)
- Arizona State Route 99
- Arkansas Highway 99 (former)
- California State Route 99
- Connecticut Route 99
- Florida State Road 99 (former)
  - County Road 99 (Escambia County, Florida)
    - County Road 99A (Escambia County, Florida)
- Georgia State Route 99
- Hawaii Route 99
- Idaho State Highway 99
- Illinois Route 99
- Iowa Highway 99 (former)
  - County Road 99 (Des Moines County, Iowa)
  - County Road 99 (Louisa County, Iowa)
- K-99 (Kansas highway)
- Kentucky Route 99
- Louisiana Highway 99
- Maine State Route 99
- Maryland Route 99
- Massachusetts Route 99
- M-99 (Michigan highway)
- Minnesota State Highway 99
- Missouri Route 99
  - Missouri Route 99 (1929) (former)
- Nebraska Highway 99
- County Route 99 (Bergen County, New Jersey)
- New Mexico State Road 99 (former)
- New York State Route 99 (former)
  - County Route 99 (Dutchess County, New York)
  - County Route 99 (Herkimer County, New York)
  - County Route 99 (Madison County, New York)
  - County Route 99 (Montgomery County, New York)
  - County Route 99 (Onondaga County, New York)
  - County Route 99 (Orleans County, New York)
  - County Route 99 (Saratoga County, New York)
  - County Route 99 (Schenectady County, New York)
  - County Route 99 (Steuben County, New York)
  - County Route 99 (Suffolk County, New York)
  - County Route 99 (Westchester County, New York)
- North Carolina Highway 99
- Ohio State Route 99
- Oklahoma State Highway 99
  - Oklahoma State Highway 99A
- Oregon Route 99
  - Oregon Route 99E
  - Oregon Route 99W
- Pennsylvania Route 99
- Rhode Island Route 99
- South Carolina Highway 99
- Tennessee State Route 99
- Texas State Highway 99
  - Texas State Highway Spur 99 (1940–1966) (former)
  - Texas State Highway Spur 99 (1981–1984) (former)
  - Farm to Market Road 99
- Utah State Route 99
- Virginia State Route 99
- Washington State Route 99
  - Washington State Route 99T (former)
- West Virginia Route 99
- Wisconsin Highway 99 (former)

== See also ==
- List of highways numbered 99E
- List of highways numbered 99W
- A99
- B99
- E 99 road (United Arab Emirates)

| Preceded by 98 | Lists of highways 99 | Succeeded by 100 |
