= 99X =

99X may refer to:

== Radio station ==
- KKPS, a radio station (99.5 FM) licensed to Brownsville, Texas, United States, which was branded 99X under the callsign KRIX during the 1980s
- KTUX, a radio station (98.9 FM) licensed to Carthage, Texas, United States, which was branded 99X during different periods from 1993 to 2018
- KXFT, a radio station (99.7 FM) licensed to Mason, Iowa, United States, which was branded 99X from 2007 to 2009
- WEPN-FM, a radio station (98.7 FM) licensed to New York, New York, United States, which was branded 99X under the callsign WXLO during the 1970s
- WMMS-HD2 and W256BT, an HD Radio digital subchannel (100.7-2 FM) and its low-power analog translator (99.1 FM) – both licensed to Cleveland, Ohio, United States – which were branded 99X from 2012 to 2017
- WWCN, a radio station (99.3 FM) licensed to Fort Myers Beach, Florida, United States, formerly branded 99X
- WNNX, a radio station (100.5 FM) licensed to College Park, Georgia, United States, which is presently branded as winter of 2022 to present and broadcasting a classic alternative format
- WWWQ, a radio station (99.7 FM) licensed to Atlanta, Georgia, United States, which was branded 99X under the callsign WNNX from 1992 to 2008
- WWWQ-HD2 and W255CJ, an HD Radio digital subchannel (99.7-2 FM) and its low-power analog translator (98.9 FM) – both licensed to Atlanta, Georgia, United States – which have been branded 99X since 2008
- WMJV, a radio station (99.5 FM) licensed to Grifton, North Carolina, United States, which was branded 99X during the 1990s

== Other uses ==
- Marion-Kay Spices 99-X, a chicken spice created by Col. Harland Sanders, which is a variant of the KFC Original Recipe

== See also ==
- X99
- 9X9
- 9X (disambiguation)
- 99 (disambiguation)
- X (disambiguation)
