= Voces (song) =

2016 song performed by Ruth Lorenzo

Single by Ruth Lorenzo

from the album Loveholic
- Released: 14 October 2016
- Recorded: 2015
- Genre: Pop
- Length: 4:12
- Label: Roster Music

Ruth Lorenzo singles chronology
"99" (2015)	"Voces" (2016)	"Good Girls Don't Lie" (2017)

"Voces" is a song by Spanish singer Ruth Lorenzo. It was released on 14 October 2016 as a digital download in Spain. The song has peaked to number 52 on the Spanish Singles Chart.

== Track listing ==
Digital download
No.	Title	Length
1.	"Voces"	4:12

== Chart performance ==
=== Weekly charts ===
Chart (2016)	Peak position
Spain (PROMUSICAE)	52

== Release history ==
Region	Date	Format	Label
Spain	14 October 2016	Digital download	Roster Music
