= B99 =

B99 may refer to:

== Transportation ==
- Beechcraft Model 99, a civilian aircraft produced by Beechcraft
- Bundesstraße 99, a German federal highway
- Jaguar B99, a concept car designed and developed by the Italian design house Bertone
- Lola B99/50, a Formula Two race car designed by Lola Cars

== Other ==
- Brooklyn Nine-Nine, an American police procedural comedy television series
- GTSE1 (also B99), an enzyme that in humans is encoded by the GTSE1 gene
- Sicilian Defence, Najdorf Variation (ECO: B90–B99), one of the most respected and deeply studied of all chess openings
