= 99th Brigade =

99th Brigade may refer to:

== Afghanistan ==
- 99th Missile Brigade

== Bangladesh ==
- 99th Composite Brigade

== India ==
- 99th Mountain Brigade, formerly 99th Indian Infantry Brigade

== Iraq ==
- 99th Brigade (Iraq)

== Spain ==
- 99th Mixed Brigade, see Mixed brigade § 1st to 100th

== United Kingdom ==
- 99th Brigade (United Kingdom)
- 99th Brigade, Royal Field Artillery, a British Army unit during World War I
- 99th (Buckinghamshire and Berkshire) Brigade, Royal Field Artillery, a British Army unit after World War I

== See also ==
- 99th Division (disambiguation)
- 99th Regiment (disambiguation)
