= Raúl Fuentes Cuenca =

Spanish pop singer also known as Raúl

Raúl
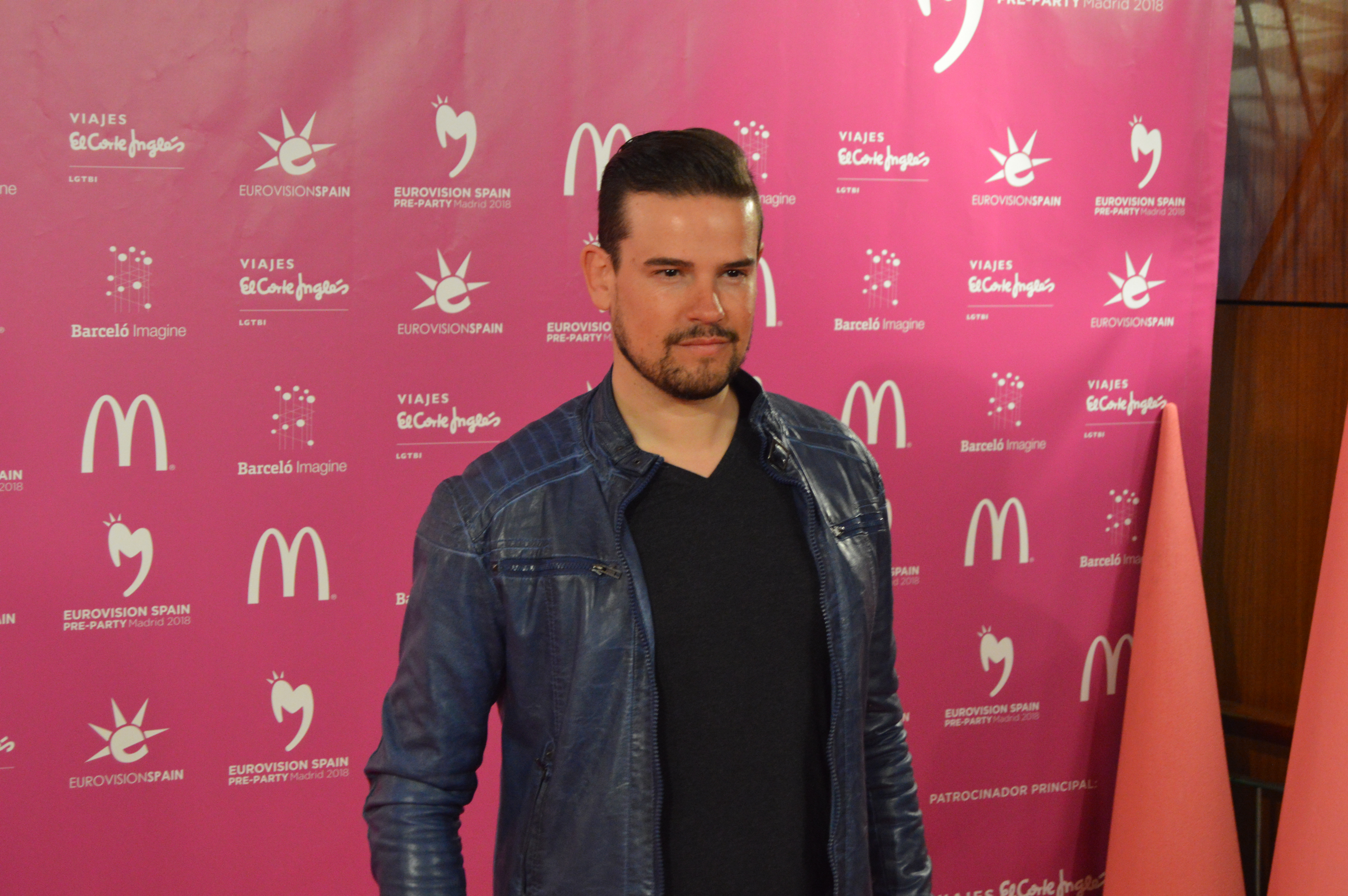

Background information
- Also known as: Raúl
- Born: Raúl Fuentes Cuenca; 9 February 1975 (age 51); Vitoria-Gasteiz, Álava, Spain
- Origin: Spain
- Genres: Latin pop
- Occupation: Singer
- Years active: 1998–present
- Website: www.raulfuentes.com

Raúl Fuentes Cuenca (born 9 February 1975) is a Spanish pop singer known by his stage name Raúl. In 2000 he participated in the Spanish national final for the Eurovision Song Contest 2000 with his song "Sueño su boca" finishing second. Since he has published several albums. In 2014 he participated in the Spanish national final for the Eurovision Song Contest 2014 with the song "Seguir sin ti", finishing fourth.

== Discography ==
=== Studio albums ===
- 2000 – Sueño su boca No. 1 Spain
- 2001 – Haciendo trampas
- 2003 – As de corazones
- 2005 – Ya no es ayer
- 2007 – Una vida
- 2011 – Contramarea

=== Other albums ===
- 2000 – Remixes y Unplugged
- 2003 – As de corazones remixes
