= Renuncio (song) =

Single by Ruth Lorenzo

from the album Planeta Azul
- Released: 17 February 2015
- Recorded: 2014
- Genre: Pop
- Length: 3:47
- Label: Roster Music
- Songwriter(s): Ruth Lorenzo

Ruth Lorenzo singles chronology
"Gigantes" (2014)	"Renuncio" (2015)	"99" (2015)

"Renuncio" (English: "I Quit") is a song by Spanish singer Ruth Lorenzo. It was released on 17 February 2015 as a digital download in Spain as the third single from her debut studio album Planeta Azul (2014). The song has peaked to number 48 on the Spanish Singles Chart.

== Music video ==
A music video to accompany the release of "Renuncio" was first released onto YouTube on 13 February 2015 at a total length of four minutes and forty-six seconds.

== Track listing ==
Digital download
No.	Title	Length
1.	"Renuncio"	3:47
2.	"Renuncio" (Piano y Voz)	3:35
3.	"Renuncio" (Christoffer Lauridsen Radio Remix)	3:57
4.	"Renuncio" (Xavi Huguet Radio Remix)	4:30
5.	"Renuncio" (Demo Version)	1:32

== Chart performance ==
=== Weekly charts ===
Chart (2015)	Peak position
Spain (PROMUSICAE)	48

== Release history ==
Region	Date	Format	Label
Spain	17 February 2015	Digital download	Roster Music
