= Gigantes (song) =

Single by Ruth Lorenzo

from the album Planeta Azul
- Released: 7 October 2014
- Recorded: 2014
- Genre: Pop
- Length: 3:36
- Label: Roster Music
- Songwriter(s): Ruth Lorenzo

Ruth Lorenzo singles chronology
"Dancing in the Rain" (2014)	"Gigantes" (2014)	"Renuncio" (2015)

"Gigantes" (English: "Giants") is a song by Spanish singer Ruth Lorenzo. It was released on 7 October 2014 as a digital download in Spain as the second single from her debut studio album Planeta Azul (2014). The song peaked at number 6 on the Spanish Singles Chart.

== Music video ==
A music video to accompany the release of "Gigantes" was first released onto YouTube on 22 October 2014 at a total length of three minutes and forty-three seconds.

== Track listing ==
Digital download
No.	Title	Length
1.	"Gigantes"	3:36

== Chart performance ==
=== Weekly charts ===
Chart (2014)	Peak position
Spain (PROMUSICAE)	6

== Release history ==
Region	Date	Format	Label
Spain	7 October 2014	Digital download	Roster Music
