= X9 =

X9 may refer to:

- X9 (New York City bus)
- X9, a Metrobus route
- X-9 Shrike, a missile
- ASC X9, the ANSI Accredited Standards Committee X9 (ASC X9)
- Khors Aircompany, former IATA code
- Former IATA code for WOW air
- Secret Agent X-9, a comic strip (1934–1996) created by Dashiell Hammett
- A binary star system located in 47 Tucanae
- XPeng X9, a battery electric minivan
- Oppo Find X9, a 2026 Oppo flagship phone

== See also ==
- 9X (disambiguation)
