= 99ers =

Long-term unemployed people in US

99ers is a colloquial term for unemployed people in the United States, mostly citizens, who have exhausted all of their unemployment benefits, including all unemployment extensions. As a result of the American Recovery and Reinvestment Act passed by Congress in February 2009, unemployed people could receive up to 99 weeks of unemployment insurance benefits, hence the name "99ers". An estimated 7 million people are affected.

The term 99ers has also been interpreted of those in the bottom 99% of the population by income or Wealth, as opposed to those in the top 1% by wealth or income who have been known to possess about a third of all wealth in the economy, enraging those who thought the one-percenters were not suffering the effects of the Great Recession proportionately to the "99ers" even though the "1%er's" actions and decisions were commonly thought to cause it. Which is what gave rise to the occupy movement.

== Unemployment benefits ==
United States unemployment benefits during the Great Recession were calculated as follows (with the availability of extensions dependent on a state's unemployment rate (see: Bureau of Labor Statistics):

Unemployment Benefits	# of Weeks
Regular Unemployment Insurance Benefits	26
Emergency Unemployment Compensation Tier 1	20
Emergency Unemployment Compensation Tier 2	14
Emergency Unemployment Compensation Tier 3	13
Emergency Unemployment Compensation Tier 4	6
Extended Benefits (13 weeks + 7 additional)	20
Total Number of Weeks	99

== Legislation ==
Legislation to extend unemployment benefits had been blocked from coming to a vote on the floor of the Senate through minority Republican filibuster or holds. This began in February 2010 with the block of an unemployment benefit funding bill vote for already authorized and granted unemployment checks for those who had not exhausted their benefits by a single Senator, Jim Bunning (R-KY).

Following that precedent, Senate floor votes on unemployment have required a supermajority of sixty votes to bring the bills to the floor. Bunning's position was that he wanted the bill paid for out of previously allocated funds from the American Recovery and Reinvestment Act of 2009. Senators who did not initially support Bunning's position since used this argument to block or delay votes on unemployment extensions that could not achieve a supermajority to reach the floor for a vote.

Economists have cited that unemployment should not have the requirement of being paid for out of an existing stimulus package because it is stimulative and, therefore, to take away allocated funds from other projects would have a self-canceling effect.

The passage of the bill to fund eligible (non-exhausted) unemployment benefits required a special appointment of a replacement senator, Carte Goodwin, by West Virginia Governor Joe Manchin, after the death of Senator Robert Byrd (D-WV), whose vote was needed for the supermajority. This gave the Senate its 60th vote for the legislation and the funds were released to the states to pay unemployment compensation to those who were eligible and who had not yet exhausted benefits as of July 2010.

The passage of the bill did not provide for those who exhausted their benefits, the 99ers.

On August 4, 2010, Senator Debbie Stabenow (D-MI) introduced a bill (S.3706) to extend unemployment past 99 weeks. The bill was referred to the Senate Finance Committee prior to the Senate breaking for their summer vacation.

=== The Americans Want to Work Act (S.3706) ===
A Senate bill introduced by Senator Debbie Stabenow (D-MI) on August 4, 2010, will, if passed, benefit those who have exhausted all of their benefits by providing an additional 20 weeks of unemployment benefits under a Tier 5. The bill has an unemployment rate threshold of 7.5% which requires states to have an unemployment rate at 7.5% or higher to qualify. The bill was announced by Senator Stabenow on MSNBC's The Ed Schultz Show (video). The bill is co-sponsored by Senators Charles Schumer (D-NY), Harry Reid (D-NV), Dick Durbin (D-IL), Carl Levin (D-MI), Bob Casey, Jr. (D-PA), Christopher Dodd (D-CT), Sherrod Brown (D-OH), Jack Reed (D-RI), and Sheldon Whitehouse (D-RI).

The proposed bill was designed to help 99ers by:

- Creating an additional tier of benefits for those who have exhausted their unemployment insurance.
- Extends the HIRE Act payroll tax exemption through the end of 2011.
- Doubles the general business tax credit to encourage businesses to hire the hardest hit Americans.

Tier 5 Unemployment Insurance (Under S.3706 Bill): What it does: Provides 20 weeks of additional unemployment insurance for states with 7.5% or higher unemployment. This tier will benefit the people who have exhausted all of their benefits.

Retroactive Eligibility: Would apply retroactively to everyone who has exhausted all of their previous tiers in recent months. However, benefits would not be paid retroactively. (Example: a claimant who exhausted his or her benefits three months ago would be eligible to begin Tier 5 at the date of enactment. He or she would not, however, be paid out for the three months in which no benefits were received. If a claimant is going to exhaust benefits in two weeks, he or she will move right onto Tier 5 and receive 20 weeks of benefits.)

Requirements: People who are unemployed still need to meet current UI law requirements such as job searches.

On August 10, 2010, Representative Shelley Berkley (D-NV) introduced a House bill (H.R. 6901) to extend benefits for another 20 additional weeks for states whose unemployment rate exceeds 10 percent:

=== The Emergency Unemployment Compensation Act (H.R. 6091) ===
A House bill introduced by Representative Shelley Berkley (D-NV-1) on August 10, 2010, will, if passed, benefit those who have exhausted all of their benefits by providing an additional 20 weeks of unemployment benefits under a Tier 5. The bill has an unemployment rate threshold of 10% which requires states to have an unemployment rate at 10% or higher to qualify. The bill is co-sponsored by Representatives Michael F. Doyle (D, PA-14), Bob Filner (D, CA-51), Barney Frank (D, MA-4), Phil Hare (D, IL-17), Dale Kildee (D, MI-5), Carolyn Kilpatrick (D, MI-13), John Lewis (D, GA-5), Jim McDermott (D, WA-7), Laura Richardson (D, CA-37), Linda Sánchez (D, CA-39), Janice Schakowsky (D, IL-9) and Diane Watson (D, CA-33).

== Media coverage in 2010 ==
CNN did a series of stories regarding 99ers.

News reports and interviews have been presented by various media outlets that include The New York Times, The Washington Post and PBS's NewsHour. The 99er cause has been championed by Ed Schultz on his MSNBC television show, where he lashed out at Congress, and hosted the announcement of Senator Stabenow's 99er bill on his MSNBC television show (video) and his radio program and by Rachel Maddow on her television program where she replayed negative statements about the unemployed by Sharron Angle, Senator Jon Kyl (R-AZ), Rep. Steve King, (R-IA), Rep. Dean Heller (R-NV), Lt. Gov. Andre Bauer (R-SC). Examiner

Both The New York Times and PBS NewsHour have covered the story.

On July 19, 2010, The Daily Beast published "Get America Back to Work" which has gathered signatures of prominent economists, academics, journalists and historians, including five Nobel Prize Laureates, in support of a statement calling for further stimulus to deal with long-term unemployment, citing Keynesian economics in support of their position: The article was signed by one hundred prominent economists, historians, academics and journalists, including: Joseph Stiglitz, Alan Blinder, John Cassidy, Lizabeth Cohen, Jim Hoge, Robert Reich, Richard Parker, Laura Tyson, Sir Harold Evans, Sean Wilentz, Kenneth Arrow, Peter Beinart, Sidney Blumenthal, Nancy Folbre, Simon Schama and Robert Solow (list).

On August 15, 2010, The Plain Dealer (Cleveland, Ohio) published an article entitled "They're Known as 'the 99ers,' and their numbers are growing in Ohio and nationwide".

In December 2010 the BBC ran a story about the 99ers titled "What happens when your unemployment benefits stop?" The article included the views of Heidi Shierholz "We can kick people off and it will certainly make people more desperate to find a job. But in a labour market like this it's not going to make them more likely to find a job because the jobs aren't there."

== Controversy ==
Republican legislators insisted that additional unemployment benefits be paid for out of existing funds. This is a departure from how unemployment benefits have been funded in the past.

Democratic supporters of additional unemployment extensions have pointed out that Republicans who are calling for unemployment benefits to be paid for out of existing funds are, in some cases, the same legislators who insist the Bush tax cuts be renewed without funding. Republicans have countered the Bush tax cuts are stimulative and therefore do not require funding.

The requirement of a supermajority to bring bills to the floor has led to heated and controversial comments, including this exchange between Senators Jim Bunning (R-KY) and Jeff Merkley (D-OR), where Senator Merkley asked Senator Bunning to stop his repeated blocks of a unanimous consent motion to extend unemployment benefits, to which Senator Bunning replied: "Tough shit."

Several other politicians, lawmakers and commentators have made controversial statements portraying the long-term unemployed as lazy, unwilling to work or on drugs, while some in favor of long term unemployment benefits have called opponents pro-death and pro-child hunger.

- Orrin Hatch proposed an amendment that would require unemployment beneficiaries to pass a drug test to qualify for programs: "Drugs are a scourge on our society – hurting children, families and communities alike. This amendment is a way to help people get off of drugs to become productive and healthy members of society, while ensuring that valuable taxpayer dollars aren't wasted."
- Glenn Beck: "Some of [the 99ers] I – frankly, I bet, should be ashamed to call them Americans"
- Alan Grayson: "I will say this to Republicans who will block this [unemployement benefits extension] bill now for months, and kept food out of the mouths of children. I will say to them now, may God have mercy on your souls."
- Sharron Angle: ""You can make more money on unemployment than you can going down and getting one of those jobs that is an honest job, but it doesn't pay as much. And so that's what's happened to us is that we have put in so much entitlement into our government that we really have spoiled our citizenry and said you don't want the jobs that are available."
- Rand Paul: "As bad as it sounds, ultimately we do have to sometimes accept a wage that's less than we had at our previous job in order to get back to work and allow the economy to get started again. Nobody likes that, but it may be one of the tough love things that has to happen."
- Tom Corbett: "People don't want to come back to work while they still have some unemployment. That's becoming a problem. The jobs are there, but if we keep extending unemployment, people are just going to sit there."
- Rush Limbaugh: "Extended unemployment benefits do nothing but incentivize people not to look for work"

On May 24, 2010, Cynthia Tucker of the Atlanta Journal-Constitution, published: Unemployment benefits make people lazy? Not so, where she reported how the economist Mark Zandi cited the lack of available jobs in response to a statement by Senator Judd Gregg (R-NH) that unemployment benefits discouraged the unemployed from looking for work.

Several prominent economists have argued long term unemployment benefits are an incentive not to work, including President Obama's former White House economic adviser Lawrence Summers, who once wrote in the Concise Encyclopedia of Economics: "The second way government assistance programs contribute to long-term unemployment is by providing an incentive, and the means, not to work. Each unemployed person has a 'reservation wage' — the minimum wage he or she insists on getting before accepting a job." A Brookings Institution panel on economic activity said in March 2010 that jobless insurance extensions "correspond to between 0.7 and 1.8 percentage points of the 5.5 percentage point increase in the unemployment rate witnessed in the current recession." Alan Reynolds of the Cato Institute found nearly two percent of the current jobless rate is due to extensions of unemployment insurance and other federal policies.

99ers have responded to these and similar statements with their own stories of repeated and unsuccessful job hunting efforts where the number of applicants have far exceeded the available positions. The Economic Policy Institute's data supports the 99ers' and Mark Zandi's position in their March 2010 report of an average of five applicants for each opening.

The Economic Policy Institute, using data provided by the Bureau of Labor Statistics, has verified that, as of September 2010, the U.S. economy would need to add 11.5 million jobs to make up for the shortfall due to the recession. In September 2010, the private sector added 64,000 jobs.

== Hiring ==
Proponents of benefits extension point out that corporations are sitting on approximately 1.8 trillion in cash while not hiring.

== Discrimination ==
Job postings with statements that only workers who are currently employed or those who've been unemployed for less than six months will be considered – thereby decreasing opportunities for the long-term unemployed – have been documented. The Huffington Post, which has chronicled the phenomenon by combing through online employment listings on sites such as Craigslist and Monster.com, has found multiple listings that use the terms: "Must be currently employed, "no unemployed applicants will be considered" or "must have been employed within the last 6 months."

An employment recruiter for the search firm Goodwin and Associates told The Huffington Post that "some companies think that the best people are already working" and "Maybe the ones looking for jobs for some reason had a problem, or were let go for a reason, or quit for a reason, but the people companies want are the type that already have a job."

Statistics provided by the Economic Policy Institute and the Bureau of Labor Statistics indicate the majority of long-term unemployed who lost their jobs due to the recession have been let go through no fault of their own in mass lay-offs that were cited by their companies as having been for economic reasons.

The exclusionary jobs postings have prompted New Jersey Assemblyman Peter Barnes (D-Middlesex) to propose legislation that would impose fines of $10,000 per incident for companies that post job advertisements which say the unemployed shouldn't bother applying.

The Bureau of Labor Statistics has released a report on the long-term experience of the jobless which states that, while more younger workers were unemployed, the older worker was the most impacted by long-term unemployment, leading to concerns that ageism may factor in hiring discrimination.

== Americans with disabilities, and the long-term unemployed ==
As Hillary Clinton asserted during the summer of 2015, "a quarter-century after passage of the Americans with Disabilities Act in 1990, it often remains difficult for persons with disabilities to gain access to meaningful and gainful employment". Many, become "99ers", as they continue to be left out of the workforce, and for those who are employed, a number of them are in under-stimulating jobs that don't fully utilize their talents and abilities". Her major primary challenger, Bernie Sanders, the current U.S. Senator from Vermont, has also raised this issue as a major concern, stating in the summer of 2015: "the real unemployment rate is much higher than the 'official' figure typically reported in the newspapers. When you include workers who have given up looking for jobs, or those who are working part time when they want to work full time, the real number is much higher than official figures would suggest."

== Organizing ==
The 99ers have begun to organize, both online and in rallies. 99ers have testified before Congress and have started multiple online sites from which to organize, meet others in their situation and to share links to resources.

A rally sponsored by Unemployed Workers Action Group (UWAG.org) took place on Wall Street in New York City on August 12, 2010, to support the S.3706 Tier 5 unemployment extension bill. It was held at Federal Hall National Memorial, at 26 Wall Street in New York City. and was attended by MSNBC's Ed Schultz and NYC's Labor Commission Representative, John Noyes:

Today on Wall Street, people who have been out of work for nearly two years rallied to ask: where's the recovery for the Middle Class? Today, I attended a rally of professional Americans who have been displaced by corporate greed and out-of-touch politicians; a passionate crowd of 99ers rallied at the Federal Hall, here in New York, in the shadow of Wall Street. They had one basic question: Where are the jobs? I'd like to tell these people that Washington is listening, but the reality is that members of Congress are back home trying to save their own jobs. You can see the passion in the eyes of the 99ers today. They just want a chance to work. That's it.

— Ed Schultz, MSNBC's The Ed Show – Video.

On September 16, 2010, a coalition of multiple 99er activist groups was formed to become one large united force to lobby Washington to pass legislation that would add weeks of benefits for all those who had exhausted all benefits without yet finding a job. They called themselves the American 99ers Union and have held a number of campaigns in which they encouraged thousands of 99er activists to fax, call and email Congress in support of a Tier 5 or other method of adding extended benefits for 99ers.

Also independent web-sites like http://fileunemployment.org/ and others have sprung up to help 99ers.

== See also ==
- Discouraged worker
- Involuntary unemployment
- Occupy Wall Street
- Ticket to Work, the American program to assist disabled workers who want to regain employment in the United States
- We are the 99%
