= 99th Division (2nd Formation) (People's Republic of China) =

99th Division (1950-1952)
- Active: 1950 - 1952
- Country: (China)
- Type: Infantry
- Size: Brigade
- Engagements: Chinese Civil War

The 99th Division (Chinese: 第99师) was formed in October 1950 from the 3rd Garrison Brigade of the Huadong Military Region.

In May 1952, the division was reorganized as the 5th Construction Engineer Division (Chinese: 建筑工程第5师).

In May 1955, the 5th Construction Engineer Division was demobilized and became China Construction Second Engineering Bureau, a part of China State Construction Engineering Corporation.
