= Spain in the Eurovision Song Contest 2014 =

- Eurovision Song Contest 2014
- Participating broadcaster: Radiotelevisión Española (RTVE)
- Country: Spain
- Selection process: Mira quién va a Eurovisión
- Selection date: 22 February 2014

Competing entry
- Song: "Dancing in the Rain"
- Artist: Ruth Lorenzo
- Songwriters: Ruth Lorenzo; Jim Irvin; Julian Emery

Placement
- Final result: 10th, 74 points

Participation chronology

Spain was represented at the Eurovision Song Contest 2014 with the song "Dancing in the Rain", written by Ruth Lorenzo, Jim Irvin and Julian Emery, and performed by Ruth Lorenzo herself. The Spanish participating broadcaster, Radiotelevisión Española (RTVE), organised the national final Mira quién va a Eurovisión in order to select its entry for the contest. Five artists and songs competed in the televised show where an in-studio jury and a public televote selected "Dancing in the Rain" performed by Ruth Lorenzo as the winner.

As a member of the "Big Five", Spain automatically qualified to compete in the final of the Eurovision Song Contest. Performing in position 19, Spain placed tenth out of the 26 participating countries with 74 points.

== Background ==
Prior to the 2014 contest, Televisión Española (TVE) until 2006, and Radiotelevisión Española (RTVE) since 2007, had participated in the Eurovision Song Contest representing Spain fifty-three times since TVE's first entry in 1961. They have won the contest on two occasions: in 1968 with the song "La, la, la" performed by Massiel and in 1969 with the song "Vivo cantando" performed by Salomé, the latter having won in a four-way tie with France, the Netherlands, and the United Kingdom. They have also finished second four times, with "En un mundo nuevo" by Karina in 1971, "Eres tú" by Mocedades in 1973, "Su canción" by Betty Missiego in 1979, and "Vuelve conmigo" by Anabel Conde in 1995. In 2013, RTVE placed twenty-first with the song "Contigo hasta el final" performed by ESDM.

As part of its duties as participating broadcaster, RTVE organises the selection of its entry in the Eurovision Song Contest and broadcasts the event in the country. RTVE confirmed its intentions to participate at the 2014 contest on 25 September 2013. In 2012 and 2013, RTVE selected the artist that would compete at the Eurovision Song Contest via an internal selection, while the song was selected via a national final. For its 2014 entry, the broadcaster announced on 20 January 2014 that it would organise a national final which would feature a competition among several artists and songs.

== Before Eurovision ==
=== Mira quién va a Eurovisión ===
Mira quién va a Eurovisión was the national final organised by RTVE that took place on 22 February 2014 at the TVE studios in Sant Cugat del Vallès (Barcelona), hosted by Anne Igartiburu. The show was broadcast on La 1, TVE Internacional as well as online via RTVE's official website rtve.es and the official Eurovision Song Contest website eurovision.tv. Five artists and songs competed with the winner being decided upon through a combination of public televoting and an in-studio expert jury. The national final was watched by 1.722 million viewers in Spain with a market share of 9.8%.

==== Competing entries ====
Five competing acts were invited by RTVE for the national final and announced on 20 January 2014 during a press conference held at the RTVE Torrespaña premises in Madrid, hosted by Anne Irgartiburu. Demo versions of the competing songs were previewed by RTVE on their official website on 3 February 2014, while the songs in their entirety were premiered a day later on 17 February also on RTVE's official website.

Artist	Song	Songwriter(s)
Brequette	"Más (Run)"	Thomas G:son; Tony Sánchez-Ohlsson
Jorge González	"Aunque se acabe el mundo"	Kiko Rodríguez; Bruno Nicolás; Leticia Fuentes; María José Fernández
La Dama	"Estrella fugaz"	Melendi
Raúl	"Seguir sin ti"	William Luque; Domingo Sánchez
Ruth Lorenzo	"Dancing in the Rain"	Ruth Lorenzo; Jim Irvin; Julian Emery

==== Final ====
The televised final took place on 22 February 2014. The running order for the five participating entries was determined during a press conference held at the RTVE Torrespaña premises in Madrid on 18 February 2014. The winner, "Dancing in the Rain" performed by Ruth Lorenzo, was selected through the combination of the votes of an in-studio jury (50%) and a public televote (50%). Brequette and Ruth Lorenzo were tied at 66 points each but since Ruth Lorenzo received the most votes from the public she was declared the winner. In addition to the performances of the competing entries, the guest performer was former Eurovision contestant Gisela who represented Andorra in 2008.

The three members of the in-studio jury that evaluated the entries during the final were:

- David Bustamante – Singer-songwriter
- Merche – Singer-songwriter
- Mónica Naranjo – Singer-songwriter, music producer

Mira quién va a Eurovisión – 22 February 2014
R/O	Artist	Song	Jury	Televote		Total	Place
R/O	Artist	Song	Jury	Percentage	Points	Total	Place
1	Brequette	"Más (Run)"	36	27.40%	30	66	2
2	La Dama	"Estrella fugaz"	18	6.93%	18	36	5
3	Ruth Lorenzo	"Dancing in the Rain"	30	30.97%	36	66	1
4	Jorge González	"Aunque se acabe el mundo"	24	25.34%	24	48	3
5	Raúl	"Seguir sin ti"	21	9.36%	21	42	4

Detailed Jury Votes
R/O	Song	D. Bustamante	Merche	M. Naranjo	Total
1	"Más (Run)"	12	12	12	36
2	"Estrella fugaz"	6	6	6	18
3	"Dancing in the Rain"	10	10	10	30
4	"Aunque se acabe el mundo"	8	8	8	24
5	"Seguir sin ti"	7	7	7	21

=== Preparation ===
The official video of the song, directed by Paloma Zapata, was filmed in March 2014 at the Fabra i Coats factory in Barcelona which featured an appearance by dancer Giuseppe Di Bella. The video premiered on 14 March 2013 on RTVE's website. The music video served as the official preview video for the Spanish entry.

=== Promotion ===
Ruth Lorenzo made several appearances across Europe to specifically promote "Dancing in the Rain" as the Spanish Eurovision entry. On 5 April, Ruth Lorenzo performed "Dancing in the Rain" during the Eurovision in Concert event which was held at the Melkweg venue in Amsterdam, Netherlands and hosted by Cornald Maas and Sandra Reemer. On 13 April, she performed during the London Preview Party, which was held at the Café de Paris venue in London, United Kingdom and hosted by Nicki French and Paddy O'Connell, as well as during the Birmingham Pride Ball event as the headline act. Lorenzo also took part in promotional activities in Sweden and Belgium where she appeared and performed on local television shows.

In addition to her international appearances, she performed the song on several television and radio shows, including the Todos Somos Raros, Todos Somos Únicos telethon on La 2 on 2 March. On 25 March, Lorenzo performed "Dancing in the Rain" during ¡Mira quién baila!, the Spanish version of Dancing with the Stars. On 27 March, Lorenzo swam with sharks at the Madrid Zoo Aquarium to fulfill her promise that she would fight her fear of sharks if she was selected to represent Spain at the 2014 contest.

== At Eurovision ==
Lorenzo presenting herself at the contest

According to Eurovision rules, all nations with the exceptions of the host country and the "Big Five" (France, Germany, Italy, Spain and the United Kingdom) are required to qualify from one of two semi-finals in order to compete for the final; the top ten countries from each semi-final progress to the final. As a member of the "Big 5", Spain automatically qualified to compete in the final on 10 May 2014. In addition to their participation in the final, Spain is also required to broadcast and vote in one of the two semi-finals. During the semi-final allocation draw on 20 January 2014, Spain was assigned to broadcast and vote in the first semi-final on 6 May 2014.

In Spain, the semi-finals were broadcast on La 2 and the final was broadcast on La 1. Both shows featured commentary by José María Íñigo. RTVE appointed Carolina Casado as its spokesperson to announce during the final the Spanish votes. The broadcast of the final was watched by 5.141 million viewers in Spain with a market share of 35.2%. This represented an increase of 2.1% from the previous year with 200,000 less viewers.

=== Final ===
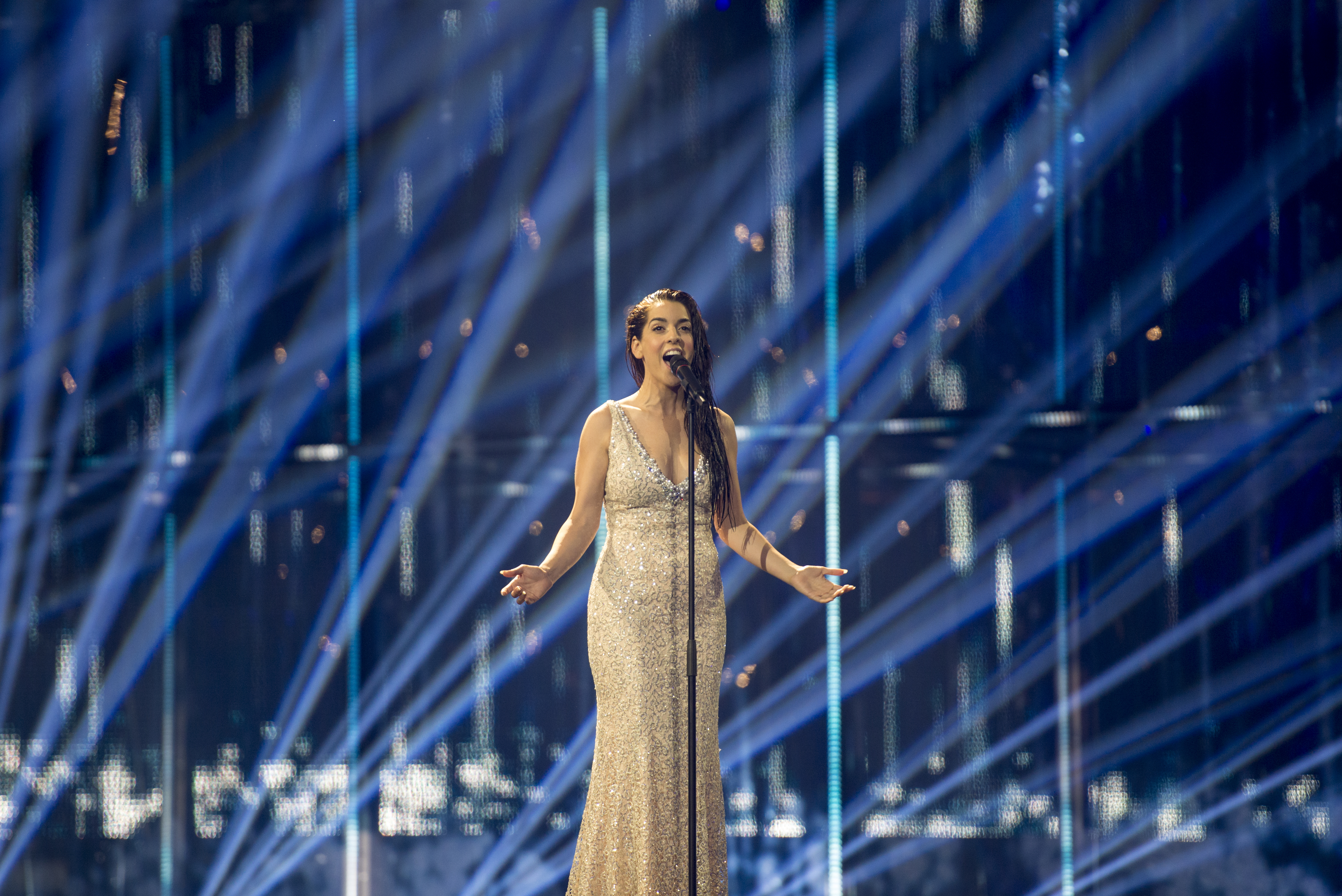
Ruth Lorenzo during a rehearsal before the final

Ruth Lorenzo took part in technical rehearsals on 4 and 6 May, followed by dress rehearsals on 9 and 10 May. This included the jury final on 9 May where the professional juries of each country watched and voted on the competing entries. After technical rehearsals were held on 6 May, the "Big 5" countries and host nation Denmark held a press conference. As part of this press conference, the artists took part in a draw to determine which half of the grand final they would subsequently participate in. Spain was drawn to compete in the second half. Following the conclusion of the second semi-final, the shows' producers decided upon the running order of the final. The running order for the semi-finals and final was decided by the shows' producers rather than through another draw, so that similar songs were not placed next to each other. Spain was subsequently placed to perform in position 19, following the entry from Finland and before the entry from Switzerland.

The Spanish performance featured Ruth Lorenzo on stage in wet hair wearing a long mermaid cut dress designed by Danish company Karim Design. The stage was predominantly blue with the cube structure displaying moving light effects that resembled falling raindrops. The performance originally featured Lorenzo wearing a Marilyn Monroe-inspired sequined dress with black steel plates designed by designer Ana Martín from Spanish company Anmargo; however, the Spanish delegation opted to use to the dress designed by Karim Design prior to the first dress rehearsal on 9 May following social media criticism. In regards to the dress change, Lorenzo stated: "The dress in the final was wonderful. I am very grateful for their work and effort, but when we saw the effect on the screen, we had to look for alternatives." An additional four off-stage backing vocalists were also part of the performance: Mey Green, Sandra Borrego, Aiwinnie MyBaby and Alana Sinkëy. Green was a backing vocalist for Spain in 2012 and 2013, while Borrego was a backing vocalist for Spain in 2011. Spain placed tenth in the final, scoring 74 points.

=== Voting ===
Voting during the three shows consisted of 50 percent public televoting and 50 percent from a jury deliberation. The jury consisted of five music industry professionals who were citizens of the country they represent, with their names published before the contest to ensure transparency. This jury was asked to judge each contestant based on: vocal capacity; the stage performance; the song's composition and originality; and the overall impression by the act. In addition, no member of a national jury could be related in any way to any of the competing acts in such a way that they cannot vote impartially and independently. The individual rankings of each jury member were released shortly after the grand final.

Following the release of the full split voting by the EBU after the conclusion of the competition, it was revealed that Spain had placed fifteenth with the public televote and eleventh with the jury vote. In the public vote, Spain scored 41 points and in the jury vote the nation scored 83 points.

Below is a breakdown of points awarded to Spain and awarded by Spain in the first semi-final and grand final of the contest, and the breakdown of the jury voting and televoting conducted during the two shows:

==== Points awarded to Spain ====
Points awarded to Spain (Final)
Score	Country
12 points	Albania
10 points	
8 points	Switzerland
7 points	
6 points	France; Ireland
5 points	Norway; Romania; United Kingdom
4 points	Israel; Latvia; Lithuania; Slovenia
3 points	
2 points	Armenia; Belgium; Estonia; Poland; Ukraine
1 point	Germany

==== Points awarded by Spain ====
Points awarded by Spain (Semi-final 1)
Score	Country
12 points	Sweden
10 points	Hungary
8 points	Portugal
7 points	Netherlands
6 points	Armenia
5 points	Ukraine
4 points	Montenegro
3 points	Iceland
2 points	Estonia
1 point	San Marino

Points awarded by Spain (Final)
Score	Country
12 points	Austria
10 points	Sweden
8 points	Romania
7 points	Netherlands
6 points	Ukraine
5 points	United Kingdom
4 points	Armenia
3 points	Denmark
2 points	Hungary
1 point	Iceland

==== Detailed voting results ====
The following members comprised the Spanish jury:

- Raúl Fuentes Cuenca (Raúl; jury chairperson) – artist
- Dámaris Abad (La Dama) – artist
- Jorge González – singer
- Leticia Fuentes – composer, singer
- Francisco Rodríguez (Kiko Rodríguez) – songwriter, singer, music producer

Detailed voting results from Spain (Semi-final 1)
R/O	Country	Raúl	La Dama	J. González	L. Fuentes	K. Rodríguez	Jury Rank	Televote Rank	Combined Rank	Points
01	Armenia	4	6	7	5	9	8	2	5	6
02	Latvia	11	13	16	16	14	15	11	13	
03	Estonia	12	3	3	6	3	4	13	9	2
04	Sweden	1	4	1	7	2	2	4	1	12
05	Iceland	8	5	6	10	5	9	8	8	3
06	Albania	9	10	9	8	10	10	14	12	
07	Russia	10	14	12	11	11	11	9	11	
08	Azerbaijan	15	15	11	15	12	13	16	15	
09	Ukraine	3	7	10	4	4	5	7	6	5
10	Belgium	14	11	15	14	14	14	12	14	
11	Moldova	16	16	14	12	13	16	15	16	
12	San Marino	13	12	13	13	16	12	6	10	1
13	Portugal	6	2	4	9	8	7	1	3	8
14	Netherlands	5	8	8	1	6	6	3	4	7
15	Montenegro	7	9	2	2	7	3	10	7	4
16	Hungary	2	1	5	3	1	1	5	2	10

Detailed voting results from Spain (Final)
R/O	Country	Raúl	La Dama	J. González	L. Fuentes	K. Rodríguez	Jury Rank	Televote Rank	Combined Rank	Points
01	Ukraine	11	11	10	7	2	5	8	5	6
02	Belarus	16	24	23	20	18	24	22	25	
03	Azerbaijan	21	19	16	23	10	19	24	23	
04	Iceland	10	5	11	15	7	9	11	10	1
05	Norway	4	4	3	21	11	7	19	13	
06	Romania	7	13	9	1	16	8	1	3	8
07	Armenia	12	10	14	17	12	13	4	7	4
08	Montenegro	6	15	6	8	17	11	23	18	
09	Poland	15	12	15	24	9	15	6	11	
10	Greece	17	14	13	22	20	17	13	14	
11	Austria	3	1	2	5	6	2	2	1	12
12	Germany	14	22	18	16	22	21	18	21	
13	Sweden	1	2	1	2	1	1	5	2	10
14	France	25	3	25	19	15	18	14	16	
15	Russia	22	21	17	18	23	23	10	17	
16	Italy	24	23	19	6	19	20	16	19	
17	Slovenia	20	18	21	9	3	14	25	22	
18	Finland	19	17	20	13	13	16	20	20	
19	Spain									
20	Switzerland	18	20	22	14	24	22	9	15	
21	Hungary	5	9	12	10	4	4	15	9	2
22	Malta	13	6	4	11	8	6	17	12	
23	Denmark	8	7	5	12	21	12	7	8	3
24	Netherlands	9	16	7	4	14	10	3	4	7
25	San Marino	23	25	24	25	25	25	21	24	
26	United Kingdom	2	8	8	3	5	3	12	6	5
