= Saab 9-X =

Car model

The Saab 9-X is a concept car by the Swedish car manufacturer Saab Automobile, designed by a group of ten Saab designers, including Michael Mauer (born 1962) and the project leader Anthony Lo. It was first shown in September 2001, at the Frankfurt Auto Show. The 9-X was designed to combine the qualities of a coupe, roadster, station wagon and pickup truck in the same car.

The car used a four wheel drive system along with an all aluminium, 300 hp (224 kW) 3.0 L turbocharged V6, mated to a six speed manual transmission and 19 inch tires. It featured fiber optic headlights, and a completely keyless ignition system.

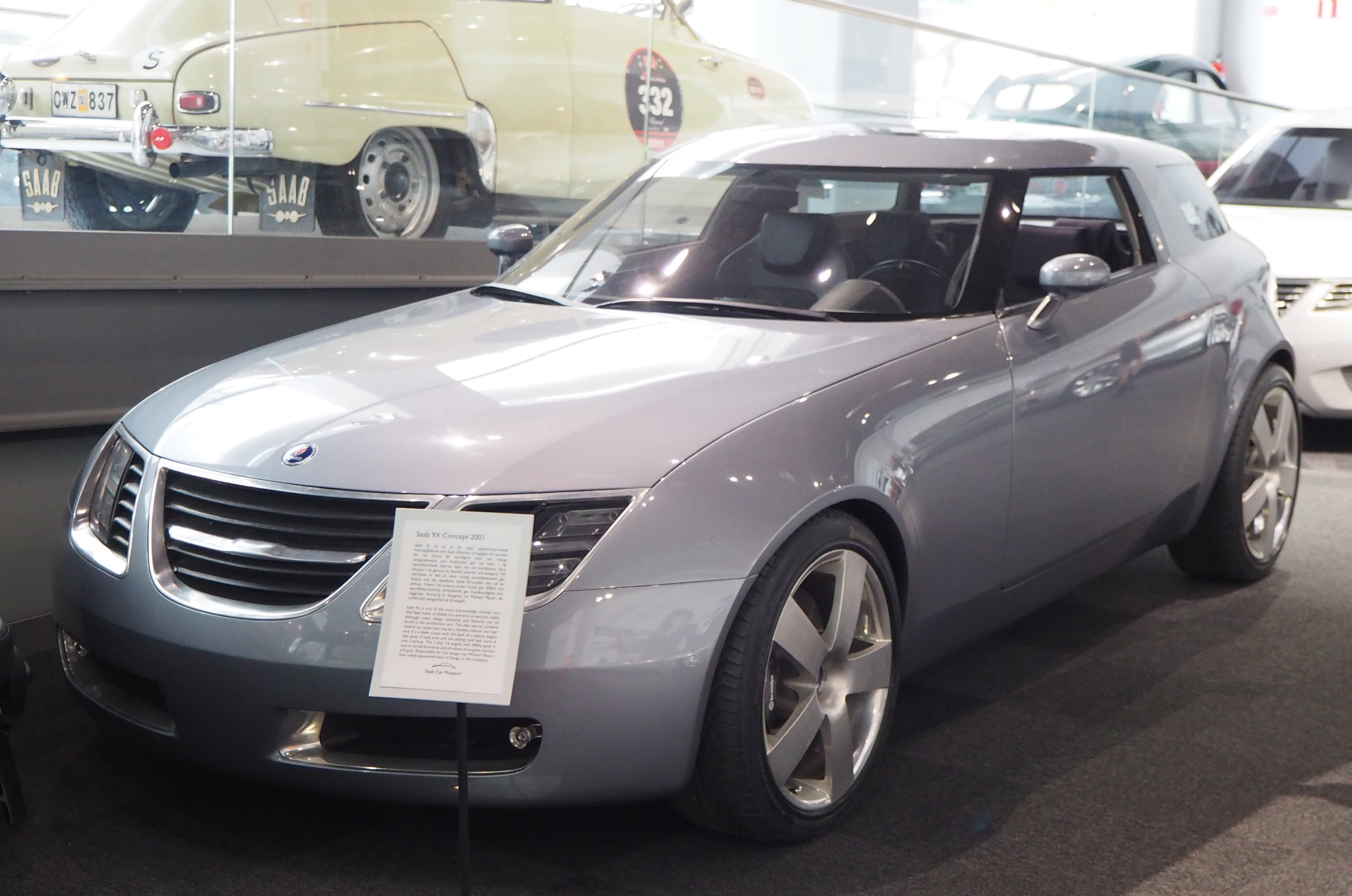

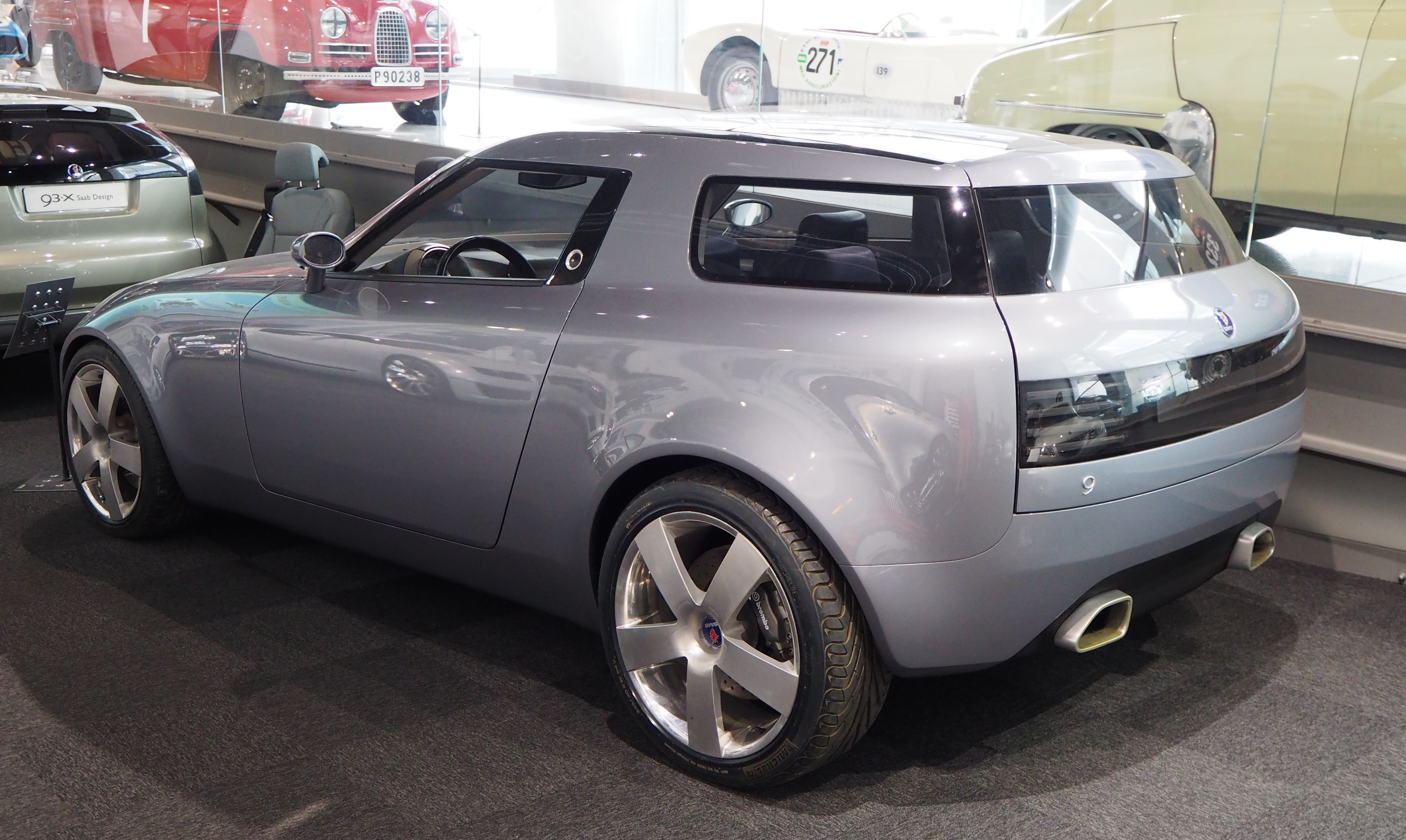

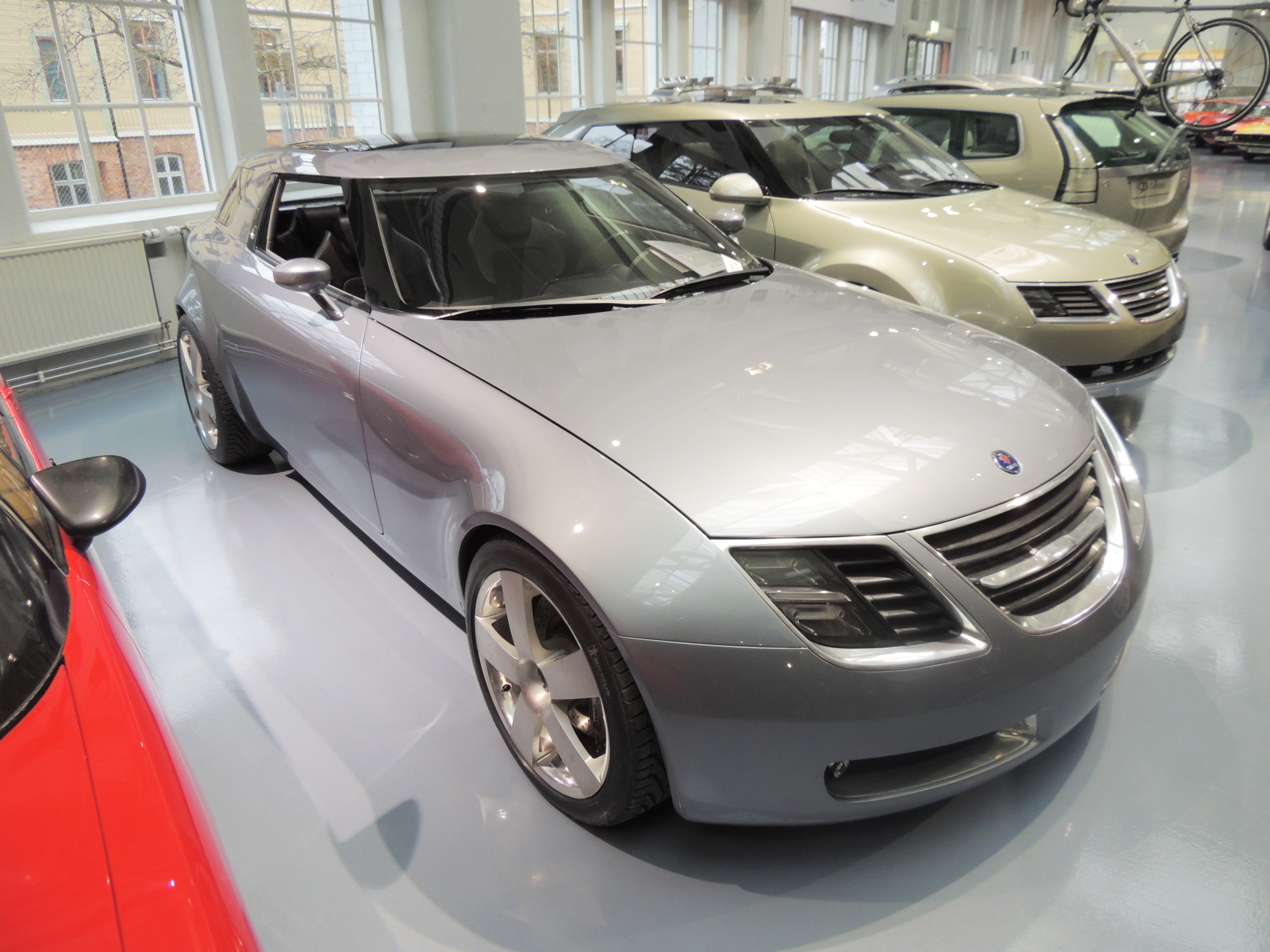
