= Unemployment extension =

Labour law

An unemployment extension occurs when regular unemployment benefits are exhausted and extended for additional weeks. Unemployment extensions are created by passing new legislation at the federal level, often referred to as an "unemployment extension bill". This new legislation is introduced and passed during times of high or above average unemployment rates. Unemployment extensions are set during a date range in order to estimate their federal cost. After expiration, the unemployment data is re-evaluated, and new legislation may be proposed and passed to further extend them.

== United States ==
In the United States, there is a standard of 26 weeks of unemployment compensation, known as "regular unemployment insurance (UI) benefits". As of December 2020, the U.S. has three programs for extending unemployment benefits: Emergency Unemployment Compensation (EUC), Extended Benefits (EB), and Pandemic Emergency Unemployment Compensation (PEUC).

The unemployment insurance program is a benefit for workers who have lost their jobs. The maximum duration of benefits has increased from 26 to 99 weeks in some states. Unemployment extensions across the U.S. are typically not a concern due to stringent policies that state unemployment agencies have enacted in recent years. The solution to the alleged problem was to implement frequent processes to ensure the individual continues to stay actively applying. Another solution was to provide seminars that help motivate individuals and keep them prepared when actively applying for jobs.

=== Emergency Unemployment Compensation ===
Emergency Unemployment Compensation (EUC) is a 100% federally funded program that provides benefits to individuals who have exhausted regular state benefits. The EUC program was created on June 30, 2008, and it has been modified several times. Most recently, the American Taxpayer Relief Act of 2012 (P.L. 112-240) extended the expiration date of the EUC program to January 1, 2014. To date, Congress has not passed any further extensions.

EUC has four levels: Tiers 1, 2, 3 and 4.

The Emergency Unemployment Compensation 2008 (EUC08) is an extension of unemployment benefits authorized under federal law. The Middle Class Tax Relief and Job Creation Act of 2012 (enacted on Feb 22, 2012) modified EUC08.

Claimants who filed an initial claim effective on or after May 7, 2006 are potentially eligible for EUC08. Individuals who are monetarily ineligible when a new benefit year is filed may qualify for EUC08 on the basis of a previous claim.

- EUC Tier 1
  - Provides up to 20 weeks of benefits (was 13 weeks before Nov 22, 2008)
  - Starting Sep 2, 2012, reduced to 14 weeks of benefits
  - Eligible to claimants who exhaust regular UI benefits
  - No state unemployment rate requirements – available in every state
- EUC Tier 2
  - Provides up to 14 weeks of benefits (was 13 weeks before Nov 6, 2009)
  - Eligible to claimants who exhaust EUC Tier 1 benefits
  - No state unemployment rate requirements – available in every state (a state high unemployment trigger was required before Nov 6, 2009)
  - Starting Jun 1, 2012, requires 3-month seasonally adjusted total unemployment rate (TUR) of at least 6.0%
- EUC Tier 3
  - Provides up to 13 weeks of benefits
  - Starting Sep 2, 2012, reduced to 9 weeks of benefits (4 weeks moved from Tier 3 to Tier 4)
  - Eligible to claimants who exhaust EUC Tier 2 benefits
  - Enacted Nov 6, 2009
  - Available in states with a: 3-month seasonally adjusted total unemployment rate (TUR) of at least 6.0%; or 13-week insured unemployment rate (IUR) of at least 4.0%
  - Starting Jun 1, 2012, TUR requirement increased to at least 7.0%; IUR requirement not changed
- EUC Tier 4
  - Provides up to 6 weeks of benefits
  - Between Feb 22, 2012 and May 31, 2012 increased to 16 weeks of benefits in states not receiving Extended Benefits (EB). Claimants may have their benefits increased in certain cases:
    - Claimants receiving Tier 4 benefits on Feb 22, 2012, in states not receiving Extended Benefits on Feb 22, 2012, will be increased to 16 weeks
    - New Tier 4 claims in this period (in states not receiving Extended Benefits the week of the new claim) are entitled to 16 weeks of benefits
    - Claimants in states that transition off Extended Benefits in this period are NOT entitled to an increase; their claim start week (compared to their state's EB status) determines whether they are entitled to 6 or 16 weeks of benefits.
  - Starting Jun 1, 2012, 16 weeks of benefits reduced to 6 weeks (EB test removed)
  - Starting Sep 2, 2012, increased to 10 weeks of benefits (4 weeks moved from Tier 3 to Tier 4)
  - Eligible to claimants who exhaust EUC Tier 3 benefits
  - Available in states with a: 3-month seasonally adjusted total unemployment rate (TUR) of at least 8.5%; or 13-week insured unemployment rate (IUR) of at least 6.0%
  - Starting Jun 1, 2012, TUR requirement increased to at least 9.0%; IUR requirement not changed

=== Extended Benefits ===
Extended Benefits (EB) are available to workers who have exhausted regular unemployment insurance benefits during periods of high unemployment. The basic Extended Benefits program provides up to 13 additional weeks of benefits when a State is experiencing high unemployment. Some States have also enacted a voluntary program to pay up to 7 additional weeks (20 weeks maximum) of Extended Benefits during periods of extremely high unemployment.

=== Pandemic Emergency Unemployment Compensation ===
Pandemic Emergency Unemployment Compensation (PEUC) is a thirteen-week extension initiated by the CARES Act.

== Reachback ==
In addition to individuals who exhausted all rights to benefits after the original date of enactment, the EUC law includes what is commonly referred to as a reachback provision. A reachback provision makes eligible those individuals who exhausted all rights to benefits prior to the original date of enactment (back to a specified date). The EUC law makes eligible all individuals whose benefit year ending date is on or after May 1, 2007. Practically speaking, this means some individuals receiving EUC may have become unemployed as early as May 2006.

== See also ==
- Involuntary unemployment
