= Dancing in the Rain (song) =

2014 song by Ruth Lorenzo

Single by Ruth Lorenzo

from the album Planeta Azul
- Released: 18 February 2014
- Recorded: 2013
- Genre: Pop
- Length: 2:50
- Label: Roster Music
- Songwriters: Ruth Lorenzo; Jim Irvin; Julian Emery
- Producers: Toni Ten; Sam Kennedy

Ruth Lorenzo singles chronology
"Love Is Dead" (2013)	"Dancing in the Rain" (2014)	"Gigantes" (2014)

Music video
- "Dancing in the Rain" on YouTube

Eurovision Song Contest 2014 entry
- Country: Spain
- Artist: Ruth Lorenzo
- Languages: English, Spanish
- Composers: Ruth Lorenzo; James Lawrence Irvin; Julian Emery
- Lyricists: Ruth Lorenzo; James Lawrence Irvin; Julian Emery

Finals performance
- Final result: 10th
- Final points: 74

Entry chronology
- ◄ "Contigo hasta el final" (2013)
- "Amanecer" (2015) ►

Song presentation
- file; help

Official performance video
- "Dancing in the Rain" (Final) on YouTube

"Dancing in the Rain" is a song recorded by Spanish singer Ruth Lorenzo, written by Lorenzo herself, Jim Irvin, and Julian Emery. It represented Spain at the Eurovision Song Contest 2014 held in Copenhagen, where it placed tenth with 74 points. It was released in Spain and the United Kingdom as a digital download on 18 February 2014, through Roster Music on iTunes.

== Background ==
=== Conception ===
"Dancing in the Rain" was composed and written by Ruth Lorenzo, Jim Irvin, and Julian Emery. Lorenzo recorded the song and released it in Spain and the United Kingdom as a digital download on 18 February 2014, through Roster Music on iTunes.

=== National Selection ===
On 22 February 2014, "Dancing in the Rain" performed by Lorenzo competed in Mira quién va a Eurovisión, the national final organised by Radiotelevisión Española (RTVE) to select its song and performer for the 59th edition of the Eurovision Song Contest. The song won the competition, becoming the Spanish entrant –and Lorenzo the performer– for Eurovision.

=== Music video ===
The official music video premiered on 14 March 2014. The video, directed by Paloma Zapata and choreographed by Myriam Benedited, was filmed in the former Fabra y Coats factory, a 19th-century spinning mill in Barcelona. The video focuses on Lorenzo, who is accompanied by Italian dancer Giuseppe Di Bella, and includes underwater scenes. The video served to introduce the Eurovision version of the song, with additional verses in English.

=== Eurovision ===
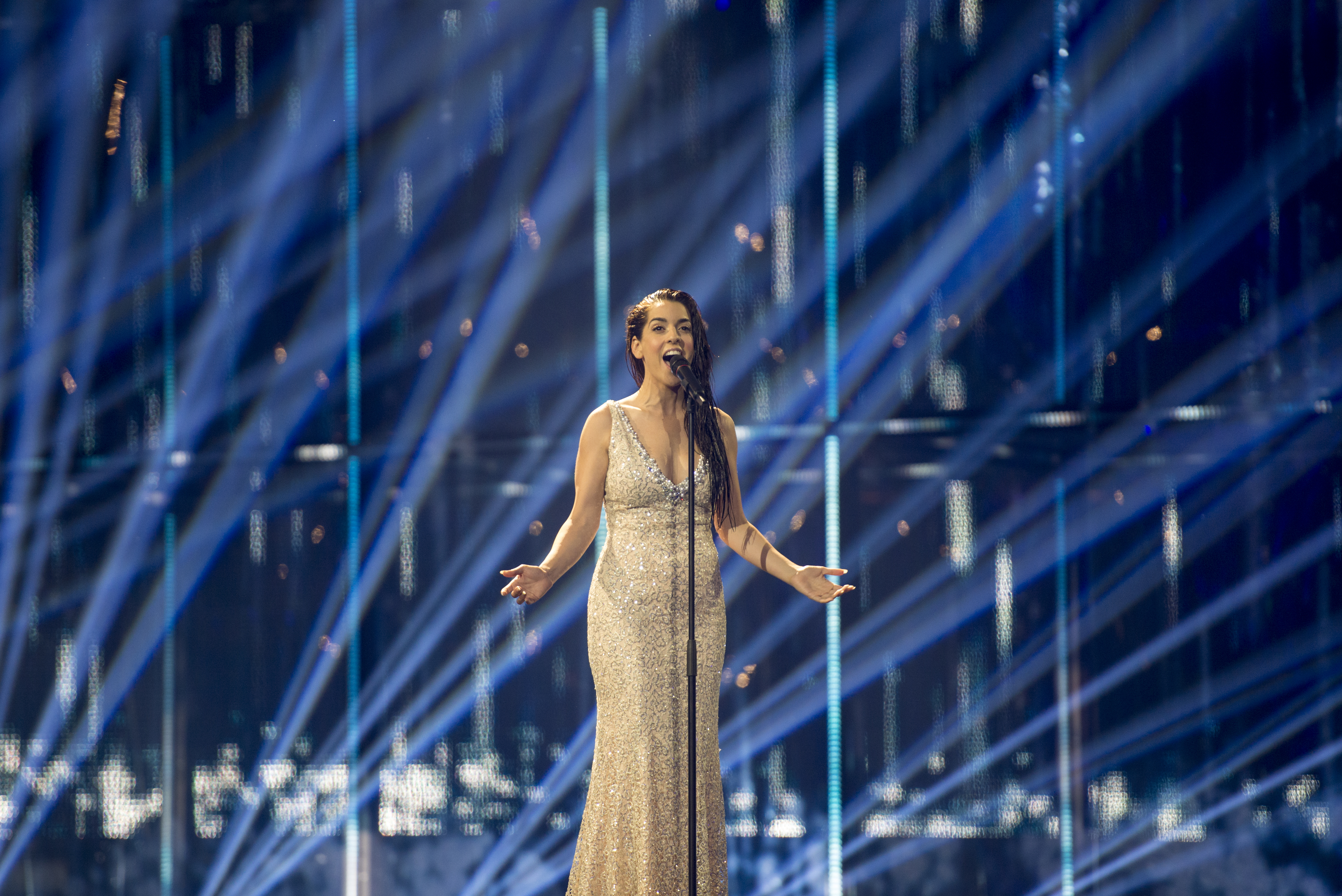
Lorenzo performing "Dancing in the Rain" in Eurovision.

On 10 May 2014, the grand final of the Eurovision Song Contest was held in B&W Hallerne in Copenhagen hosted by the Danish Broadcasting Corporation (DR) and broadcast live throughout the continent. Lorenzo performed "Dancing in the Rain" nineteenth on the evening. As they noticed during rehearsals that the dress designed by the Spanish firm Anmargo that she was going to wear was not appropriate for the stage lights, she had to borrow a wedding dress from the Danish firm Karim Design. She was accompanied by four off-stage backing vocalists: Mey Green, Sandra Borrego, Aiwinnie MyBaby, and Alana Sinkëy.

At the close of voting, it had received 74 votes, placing tenth in a field of twenty-six songs. It received 12 points only from Albania.

== Track listings ==
Digital download
No.	Title	Length
1.	"Dancing in the Rain"	2:59
2.	"Dancing in the Rain" (Official Eurovision 2014 - Spain)	2:52

Cahill Remixes EP
No.	Title	Length
1.	"Dancing in the Rain" (Cahill English Radio Mix)	3:37
2.	"Dancing in the Rain" (Cahill English Club Mix)	6:30
3.	"Dancing in the Rain" (Cahill Spanish & English Radio Mix)	3:37
4.	"Dancing in the Rain" (Cahill Spanish & English Club Mix)	6:30

== Charts history ==
=== Weekly charts ===
Chart (2014)	Peak position
Austria (Ö3 Austria Top 40)	69
Germany (GfK)	54
Ireland (IRMA)	75
Spain (Promusicae)	5
Switzerland (Schweizer Hitparade)	69
UK Singles (Official Charts)	100

== Release history ==
Country	Date	Format	Label	Ref.
Spain	18 February 2014	Digital download	Roster Music	
United Kingdom	18 March 2014	Digital download	Roster Music	
Spain	29 April 2014	CD single	Roster Music	
