= Loveaholic (album) =

Studio album by Ruth Lorenzo
- Released: 9 March 2018
- Label: Raspberry Records
- Producer: Red Triangle

Ruth Lorenzo chronology
Planeta Azul (2014)	Loveaholic (2018)	Black Sheep (2025)

Singles from Loveaholic
- 1. "Good Girls Don’t Lie" Released: 13 October 2017

Loveaholic is the second studio album by Spanish singer Ruth Lorenzo, released on 9 March 2018.

== Promotion ==
=== Singles ===
"Good Girls Don’t Lie" was released as the album's lead single on 13 October 2017. The song debuted at number 3 on the Spanish Singles Chart.

=== Promotional singles ===
Prior to the album's release, three songs were released as promotional singles. "My Last Song" was the first to be released on 14 February 2018. "Loveaholic" was released on 23 February 2018. "Bring Back the New" was released on 2 March 2018.

== Track listing ==
Loveaholic
No.	Title	Writer(s)	Producer(s)	Length
1.	"Bring Back the New"	Ruth Lorenzo; George Tizzard; Rick Parkhouse; Pinto "Wahin"	Red Triangle	3:36
2.	"Good Girls Don’t Lie"	Lorenzo; Tizzard; Parkhouse	Red Triangle	3:52
3.	"The First Man"	Lorenzo; Chris Wahle; Norma Jean Martine	Red Triangle	3:47
4.	"Ride"	Lorenzo; Wahle; Andreas Öhrn	Red Triangle	2:58
5.	"Loveaholic"	Lorenzo; Tizzard; Parkhouse	Red Triangle	3:14
6.	"My Last Song"	Lorenzo; Tizzard; Parkhouse	Red Triangle	4:25
7.	"Bodies"	Lorenzo; Wahle; Öhrn	Red Triangle	3:33
8.	"Moscas Muertas"	Lorenzo	Red Triangle	3:48
9.	"Freaks"	Lorenzo; Oliver Martín; Tizzard; Parkhouse	Red Triangle	3:07
10.	"Spanish Guitar"	Lorenzo; Tizzard; Parkhouse	Red Triangle	3:20
11.	"Another Day" (featuring Jeff Beck)	Lorenzo; Francis Rodino; Tizzard; Parkhouse	Red Triangle	4:47
12.	"Amanecer"	Lorenzo	Red Triangle	2:43

== Charts ==
Chart (2018)	Peak position
Spanish Albums (PROMUSICAE)	9
