= Burn (Ruth Lorenzo song) =

Single by Ruth Lorenzo
- Released: 27 June 2011
- Recorded: 2011
- Genre: Rock
- Length: 3:39
- Label: Rollon Entertainment

Ruth Lorenzo singles chronology
"Hero" (2008)	"Burn" (2011)	"The Night" (2013)

"Burn" is the debut single by Spanish singer Ruth Lorenzo. The song is a cover originally sung by London-based singer Caiyo (a.k.a. Francis Rodino) from his 2009 album Circles and Squares. It was released on 27 June 2011 as a digital download in Spain. The song entered the Spanish Singles Chart at number 16.

== Track listing ==
Digital download
No.	Title	Length
1.	"Burn" (Radio Mix)	3:39
2.	"Burn" (Acoustic Version)	3:50

== Chart performance ==
On 3 July 2011 the song entered the Spanish Singles Chart at number 16.

=== Weekly charts ===
Chart (2011)	Peak position
Spain (Promusicae)	16

== Release history ==
Region	Date	Format	Label
Spain	27 June 2011	Digital download, CD single	Rollon Entertainment
