= 99th Street =

99th Street may refer to:

== In New York ==
- 99th Street (Manhattan)
- 99th Street (IRT Third Avenue Line)
- 99th Street (IRT Second Avenue Line)
- 99th Street (IRT Ninth Avenue Line), a defunct aboveground station, closed 1940

== Elsewhere ==
- 99th Street/Beverly Hills station, Chicago
