= GTSE1 =

Protein-coding gene in the species Homo sapiens

Identifiers
- Aliases: GTSE1, B99, G2 and S-phase expressed 1
- External IDs: OMIM: 607477; MGI: 1352755; HomoloGene: 8489; GeneCards: GTSE1; OMA:GTSE1 - orthologs

Gene location (Human)
Chr.	Chromosome 22 (human)
Band	22q13.31	Start	46,296,870 bp
Band	22q13.31	End	46,330,810 bp

Gene location (Mouse)
Chr.	Chromosome 15 (mouse)
Band	15 E2|15 40.42 cM	Start	85,743,946 bp
Band	15 E2|15 40.42 cM	End	85,760,774 bp
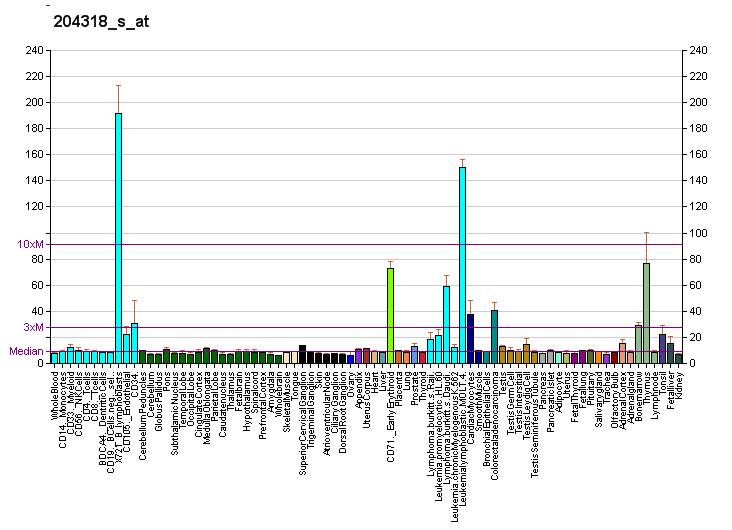

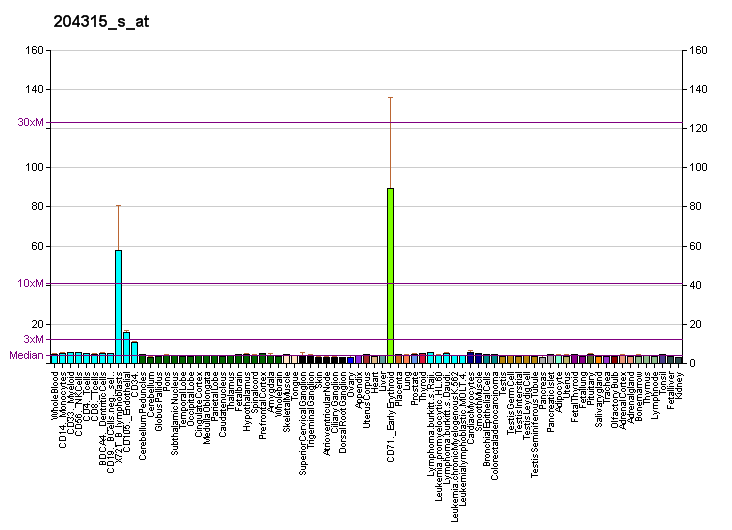

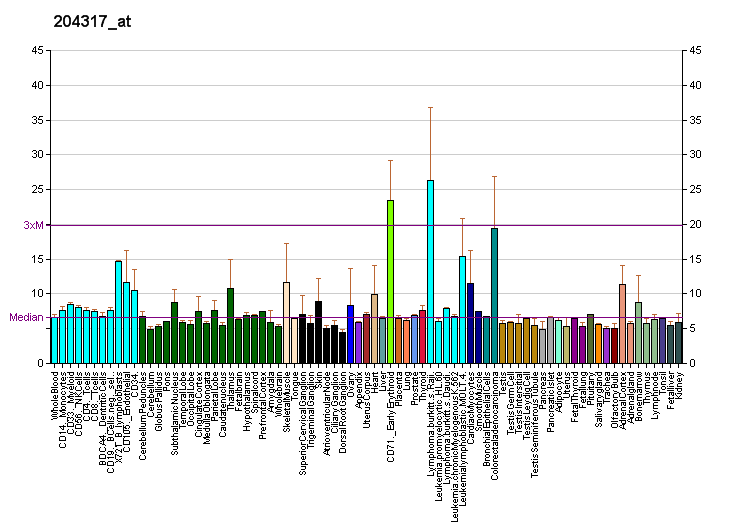
RNA expression pattern
Bgee	Human / Mouse (ortholog); Top expressed in: trabecular bone; buccal mucosa cell; pancreatic ductal cell; periodontal fiber; sperm; cardia; ventricular zone; endothelial cell; pylorus; nipple / Top expressed in: zygote; tail of embryo; secondary oocyte; epiblast; yolk sac; ventricular zone; blastocyst; embryo; genital tubercle; primary oocyte; More reference expression data
BioGPS	More reference expression data
Gene ontology
Molecular function	protein binding; molecular function
Cellular component	cytoplasm; cytoplasmic microtubule; microtubule; cytoskeleton; membrane; cytosol; nucleoplasm
Biological process	DNA damage response, signal transduction by p53 class mediator resulting in cell cycle arrest; microtubule-based process; regulation of cell cycle G2/M phase transition; negative regulation of microtubule binding; positive regulation of protein localization to nucleus; proteasome-mediated ubiquitin-dependent protein catabolic process; positive regulation of protein export from nucleus; protein stabilization; positive regulation of cell migration
Sources:Amigo / QuickGO
Orthologs
Species	Human	Mouse
Entrez	51512	29870
Ensembl	ENSG00000075218	ENSMUSG00000022385
UniProt	Q9NYZ3	Q8R080
RefSeq (mRNA)	NM_016426	NM_001168672; NM_013882
RefSeq (protein)	NP_057510	NP_001162143; NP_038910
Location (UCSC)	Chr 22: 46.3 – 46.33 Mb	Chr 15: 85.74 – 85.76 Mb
PubMed search
- Wikidata
View/Edit Human	View/Edit Mouse

G2 and S phase-expressed protein 1 is an enzyme that in humans is encoded by the GTSE1 gene.

The protein encoded by this gene is only expressed in the S and G2 phases of the cell cycle, where it colocalizes with cytoplasmic tubulin and microtubules. In response to DNA damage, the encoded protein accumulates in the nucleus and binds the tumor suppressor protein p53, shuttling it out of the nucleus and repressing its ability to induce apoptosis.
