= A99 =

A99 or A-99 may refer to:

- A99 road (Great Britain), a major road in the UK
- A 99 motorway (Germany)
- Dutch Defence, in the Encyclopaedia of Chess Openings
- Sony Alpha 99, a DSLT camera
