= 99th Regiment =

99th Regiment of 99th Infantry Regiment may refer to:

- 99th Regiment of Foot (disambiguation), several units of the British Army

Union Army (American Civil War):

- 99th Illinois Infantry Regiment
- 99th Indiana Infantry Regiment
- 99th New York Infantry Regiment
- 99th Ohio Infantry Regiment
