= 99th Regiment of Foot (disambiguation) =

Six regiments of the British Army have been numbered the 99th Regiment of Foot:

- 99th Regiment of Foot (1761), raised in 1761
- 99th Regiment of Foot (Jamaica Regiment), raised in 1780
- 99th Regiment of Foot (1794), raised in 1794
- 99th Regiment of Foot (Prince of Wales's Tipperary Regiment), raised in 1804 and renumbered as the 98th in 1816
- 99th Regiment of Foot (Prince Regent's County of Dublin Regiment), renumbered from the 100th in 1816
- 99th Duke of Edinburgh's (Lanarkshire) Regiment of Foot, raised in 1824
