= 99 Squadron =

99 Squadron or 99th Squadron may refer to:

- No. 99 Squadron RAAF, a unit of the Australian Royal Air Force
- No. 99 Squadron RAF, a unit of the United Kingdom Royal Air Force
- 99th Airlift Squadron, a unit of the United States Air Force
- 99th Flying Training Squadron, a unit of the United States Air Force
- 99th Reconnaissance Squadron, a unit of the United States Air Force
- VPB-99 (Patrol Bombing Squadron 99), a former unit of the United States Navy
