= Ruth Lorenzo =

Spanish singer (born 1982)

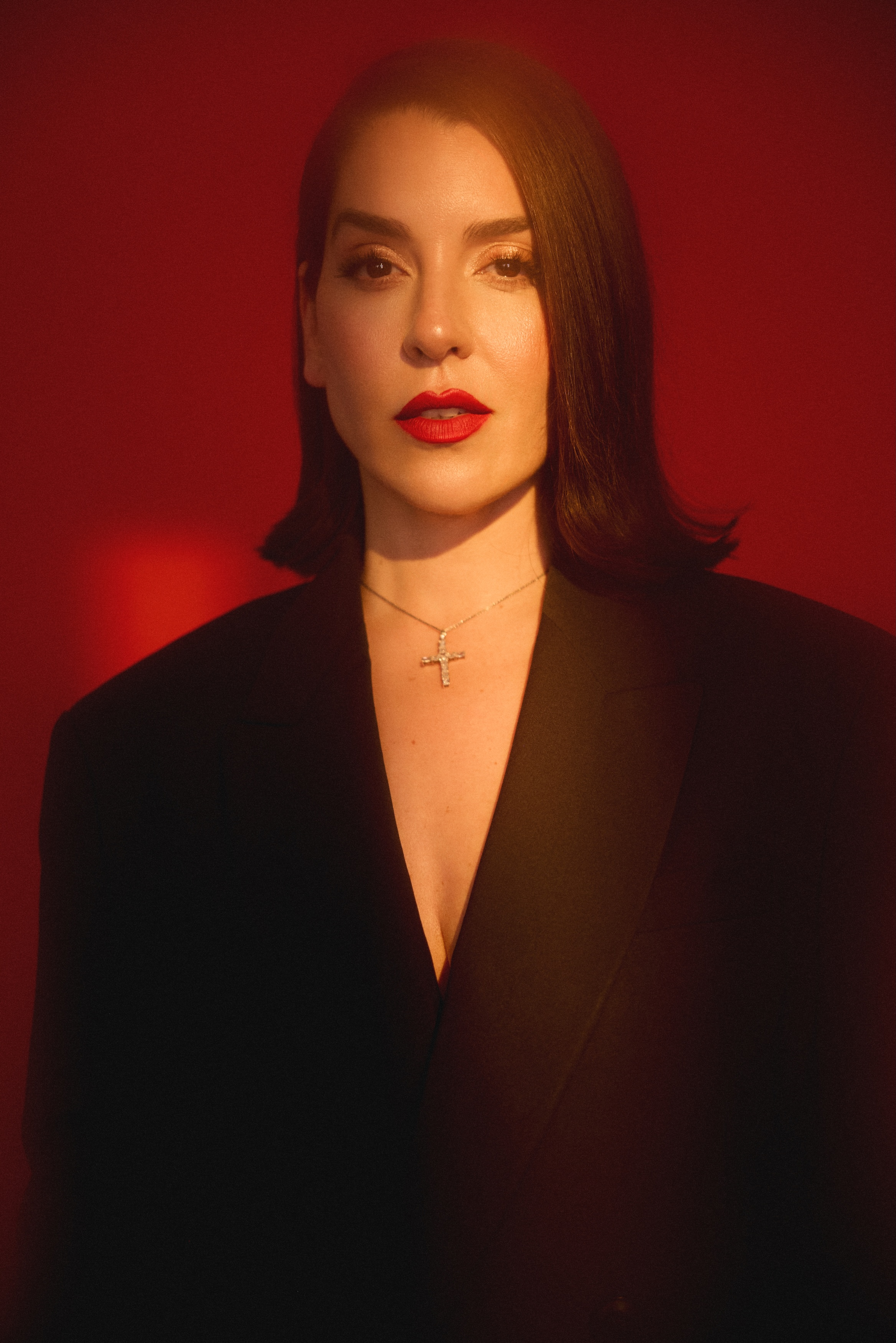
- Ruth Lorenzo in 2025

Background information
- Born: Ruth Lorenzo Pascual; 10 November 1982 (age 43); Las Torres de Cotillas (Murcia), Spain
- Genres: Pop; Rock; rock en Español
- Occupations: Singer-songwriter, actress, television presenter
- Instruments: Vocals, guitar, piano
- Years active: 2008–present
- Labels: Virgin/EMI Records (2009–2010); H&I Music (2012–2013); Roster Music (2013–2017); Raspberry Records (2017–present); BAKERS INC Music (2024–present)
- Website: www.ruthofficial.com

Ruth Lorenzo Pascual (Spanish pronunciation: [ˈrut ˈloɾenθo]; born 10 November 1982) is a Spanish singer, composer and television personality, best known in the UK for been the eighth contestant eliminated on the fifth series of the British TV talent show The X Factor in 2008. She represented Spain in the Eurovision Song Contest 2014 with the song "Dancing In The Rain", scoring 74 points in the final and finishing in 10th place; the song peaked at #5 on the Spanish Singles Chart and also charted in the UK at #100.

Artists such as Auryn and Dannii Minogue have included compositions of hers in their albums.

Her debut single "Burn" entered the Spanish Singles Charts and reached number 16 when she released the single on 27 June 2011. She released her first UK single, "The Night", on 15 June 2013, featuring a club remix by Almighty.

Her debut album Planeta Azul was released on 27 October 2014, with the number six single on the Spanish Single Charts Gigantes. In November 2017 "Good Girls Don't Lie" was released as the first single from her second album, Loveaholic (9 March 2018). The song made it to number one on iTunes Spain in the first 24 hours. Loveaholic includes a collaboration with guitarist Jeff Beck.

She achieved a Guinness World Record in 2016 for performing in eight Spanish cities in 12 hours, in a breast cancer awareness charity event.

== Early life ==
Ruth Lorenzo was born on 10 November 1982 in the Region of Murcia, in south-eastern Spain. At a very young age she became a fan of the musical Annie and although she had no idea of what the words meant she would sing along to the songs in English. When she was six years old she discovered music by Catalan opera singer Montserrat Caballé, and after her mother bought her an album by Caballé, Lorenzo began to sing opera, imitating Caballé's vocals until she was pitch perfect. At the age of 12, Lorenzo's family moved to Utah in the United States, where for the first time she had the opportunity to be involved in music at school. After much encouragement from her teachers, Lorenzo was entered into competitions and played lead roles in musical productions such as The Phantom of the Opera and My Fair Lady. When Lorenzo turned 16 the family returned to Spain and although having had singing lessons by this time, she had to cancel these lessons due to family financial difficulty and as a result Lorenzo gave up on her dream of becoming a recording artist. When Lorenzo was 19 she joined a rock band, which was a challenge for her as she had only sung opera music. She also made a big decision to quit her job in her family's business in order to pursue her dreams once again, but after three years of touring around Spain the group decided to split up. Lorenzo landed a contract at Polaris World where in addition to performing, she worked as a PR consultant.

== Career ==
=== 2008: The X Factor ===
In 2008, Lorenzo auditioned for the fifth series of The X Factor in front of judges Simon Cowell, Cheryl Cole and Louis Walsh. She sang "(You Make Me Feel Like) A Natural Woman". She impressed the judges and made it through to the next stage of the show, "bootcamp". Lorenzo passed both stages of bootcamp and was sent to St. Tropez with the other successful contestants from the over-25s category. There she auditioned in front of Dannii Minogue who was her X Factor mentor. After an emotional performance of "True Colors", sung in Spanish, Minogue decided to pick Lorenzo for her final three who would proceed to the live shows. On the first live show she sang "Take My Breath Away" in English and Spanish. She had mainly good comments, especially from Cowell, who told her she should sing in Spanish more often. However, the next week Lorenzo sang "I Just Can't Stop Loving You" in English only, and ended up in the bottom two. She performed "Purple Rain" in the singoff, and it saved her into the next week. In Week 5, Lorenzo was in the bottom two again against one of the crowd favourites Laura White. This time she sang "Knockin' on Heaven's Door" and was saved by Cowell, Minogue and Walsh. Her performance was overshadowed by the uproar over White's departure. Voting statistics revealed that White received more votes than Lorenzo meaning if Walsh sent the result to deadlock, White would’ve been saved. During Take That week, Lorenzo sang "Love Ain't Here Anymore". She received high praise for her performance, with Cowell saying it was sensational. By the quarter-final, Lorenzo was Minogue's last remaining contestant and she was eliminated after receiving the fewest public votes. Lorenzo bowed out with another performance of "Always". Former friend Alexandra Burke went on to win the show.

==== Performances on The X Factor ====
The X Factor performances and results
Week	Song	Theme (if any)	Result
Week 1	"Take My Breath Away"	Number one songs in UK and US	Safe 10th (3.47%)
Week 2	"I Just Can't Stop Loving You"	Songs by Michael Jackson or The Jackson 5	Bottom two 10th (2.95%)
Final Showdown (Week 2)	"Purple Rain"	Contestants' choice	Saved by deadlock
Week 3	"Summertime"	Big band	Safe 5th (8.93%)
Week 4	"No More Tears (Enough Is Enough)"	Disco	Safe 5th (10.25%)
Week 5	"My All"	Songs by Mariah Carey	Bottom two 7th (6.94%)
Final Showdown (Week 5)	"Knockin' On Heaven's Door"	Contestants' choice	Saved by judges
Week 6	"Angels"	Best of British	Safe 3rd (13.91%)
Week 7	"Love Ain't Here Anymore"	Songs by Take That	Safe 3rd (16.07%)
Quarter-Final	"I Love Rock 'n' Roll"	Songs by Britney Spears	Eliminated by public vote 5th (15.23%)
Quarter-Final	"Always"	American classics	Eliminated by public vote 5th (15.23%)

=== 2009–10: After The X Factor ===
Lorenzo performed at gigs across the UK and Ireland in December 2008 and January 2009. In February and March 2009, she joined the X Factor Live tour with fellow contestants. She was nominated for three awards at the Digital Spy Reality TV Awards. Lorenzo officially confirmed her record deal with Virgin Records on 6 May with an interview with Xpose.

In 2010, Lorenzo was approached by Spanish TV Channel Cuatro and asked to write a song for their new fictional drama Valientes. She accepted and composed two songs for the show, one for the opening ("Quiero Ser Valiente") and one for the end credits ("Te Puedo Ver"). Ruth performed "Quiero Ser Valiente" on Friday 22 January on the Spanish talent show Fama a bailar (which was also aired on Cuatro). In July 2010 it was revealed that Lorenzo had written songs for Dannii Minogue's comeback album revealed on Dannii's ITV2 show Style Queen. Lorenzo confirmed in a blog posting that she parted away from Virgin Records/EMI due to "creative differences" and that she would continue working on her album as an independent artist.

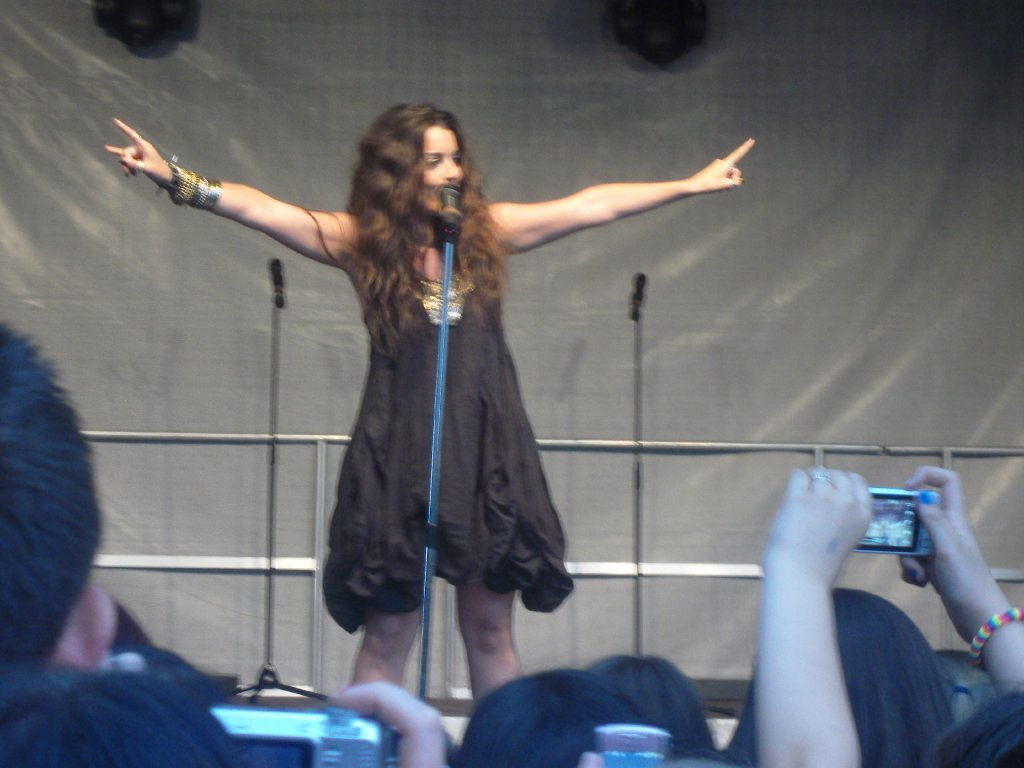
Ruth performing live in Ayr, Scotland

=== 2011–13: The Raspberry Pattern ===
She signed up to website indiegogo.com where fans helped to fund her debut single. The funding was for airplay, the video shooting, marketing and PR services. The CD version included "Burn", an acoustic version of the song and "Eternity". The Raspberry Pattern became the name of her band. Lorenzo was booked for more dates around the United Kingdom for the summer and autumn of 2011. She released a free track download titled "The Night" for her Facebook fans in August 2012 which was officially released in June 2013 with a videoclip. On 11 November a lyric video for her single "Love is Dead" was uploaded to her YouTube channel. The single was released under the independent H&I Music on digital platforms, including the song "Pain" as a B-side. At the end of 2013 Lorenzo signed with a new record company, Spanish company Roster Music, and unveiled her new website.

During 2013 she took part on the Celebrities On Ice tour in the UK.

=== 2014: Planeta Azul and Eurovision Song Contest ===
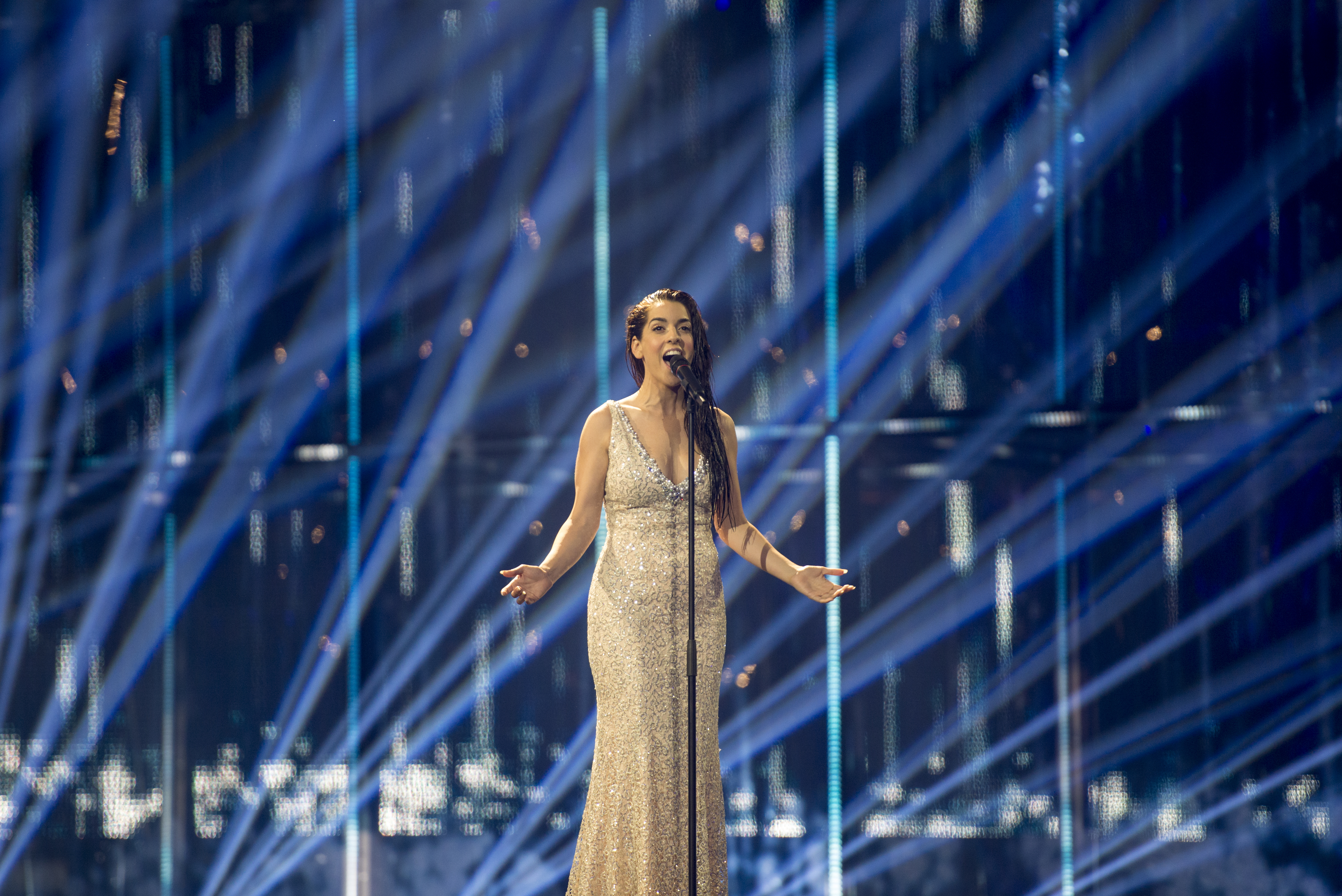
Lorenzo at a rehearsal in Copenhagen for Eurovision 2014

Her website announced the upcoming release of her first studio album. She went to Los Angeles, California to record various tracks for her album, to be titled Planeta Azul.

On 20 January,2014 Radiotelevisión Española (RTVE) selected Lorenzo as one of the potential five candidates to represent Spain at Eurovision Song Contest. Months earlier the eurovision-spain.com website made a survey known as "La Elección Interna" among Eurovision fans and international juries from thirteen countries to check who could be the ideal Spanish candidate to represent Spain. Lorenzo came second in the list among one hundred Spanish candidates In February the song "Dancing In The Rain" was released as one of the Spanish pre-selection entries for the Eurovision Song Contest 2014. The song was released on 18 February and it became number one on iTunes Spain. On 22 February she won the Spanish national final. Therefore, she represented Spain in the contest with the song "Dancing In The Rain" on 10 May 2014 in Copenhagen, Denmark. The song finished 10th during the grand final.

Her debut album Planeta Azul was released on 27 October 2014. The album contains thirteen new songs, and also a new version of "Dancing In The Rain". The release of the album was preceded by the release of its lead single, "Gigantes", on 7 October 2014, which debuted at number six on the Spanish Singles Chart. The official video for the single was released on 22 October.

=== 2015–2016: After Eurovision, Tu Cara Me Suena ===
In 2015, Lorenzo served as a judge in the Spanish talent show Levántate (Spanish version of Stand Up for Your Country), aired on Telecinco from 10 February 2015 to 17 March 2015. She also served as a member of the Spanish jury in the Eurovision Song Contest 2015.

On 16 October 2015, a special repackage of her debut album Planeta Azul was released, which includes new tracks and some songs she had recorded previously in English language. One of the new tracks, titled "99", was released as a single on 28 August 2015.

On 30 July 2015, Lorenzo was announced to join the cast of the fourth season of spanish version of the television show Your Face Sounds Familiar, in which celebrity contestants impersonate a different iconic music artist on stage each week. The season premiered on 18 September 2015 on Antena 3. In the season finale that took place on 29 January 2016, she was declared winner with 47% of the televote.

==== Performances on Tu Cara Me Suena ====
Tu cara me suena performances and results
Week	Portraying	Song	Points	Result
Week 1	Lady Gaga	"The Edge of Glory"	24	1st place
Week 2	Freddie Mercury and Montserrat Caballé	"Barcelona"	22	2nd place
Week 3	María Jiménez	"Se Me Olvidó Otra Vez"	11	8th place
Week 4	Sinéad O'Connor	"Nothing Compares 2 U"	21	2nd place
Week 5	Tina Turner	"Proud Mary"	24	1st place
Week 6	Amaral	"Toda La Noche En La Calle"	14	6th place
Week 7	Marilyn Manson	"Personal Jesus"	21	2nd place
Week 8	Céline Dion	"All By Myself"	22	2nd place
Week 9	Amy Winehouse	"Back to Black"	21	2nd place
Week 10	Jessica Rabbit	"Why Don't You Do Right?"	22	1st place
Week 11	Gloria Estefan	"Conga"	10	7th place
Week 12	Conchita Wurst	"Rise Like a Phoenix"	19	4th place
Week 13	Florence & the Machine	"Shake It Out"	20	3rd place
Week 14	Mariah Carey	"All I Want For Christmas Is You"	17	4th place
Week 15 (1st Semi-Final)	P!nk	"Glitter in the Air"	22	1st place (1st qualifier for the final)
Week 16 (2nd Semi-Final)	David Bowie	"Heroes"	Already qualified	Already qualified
Week 17 (Final)	Jennifer Hudson	"And I Am Telling You I'm Not Going"	47%	Season's Winner
TOTAL			290	

==== Voces Tour ====
After a short break from television, the artist focused on music, recording her new album between Berlin, Stockholm, Madrid, Barcelona and London.

On 14 May, she joined the television show Objetivo Eurovisión to discuss about the Eurovision Song Contest 2016 and the Spanish candidate.

In September 2016, she announced that on 19 October she would achieve a Guinness World Record with the goal of getting funds breast cancer cause. The record consisted in holding eight concerts in eight Spanish towns in less than twelve hours (Un Récord Por Ellas - a Guinness Record Award for Women).

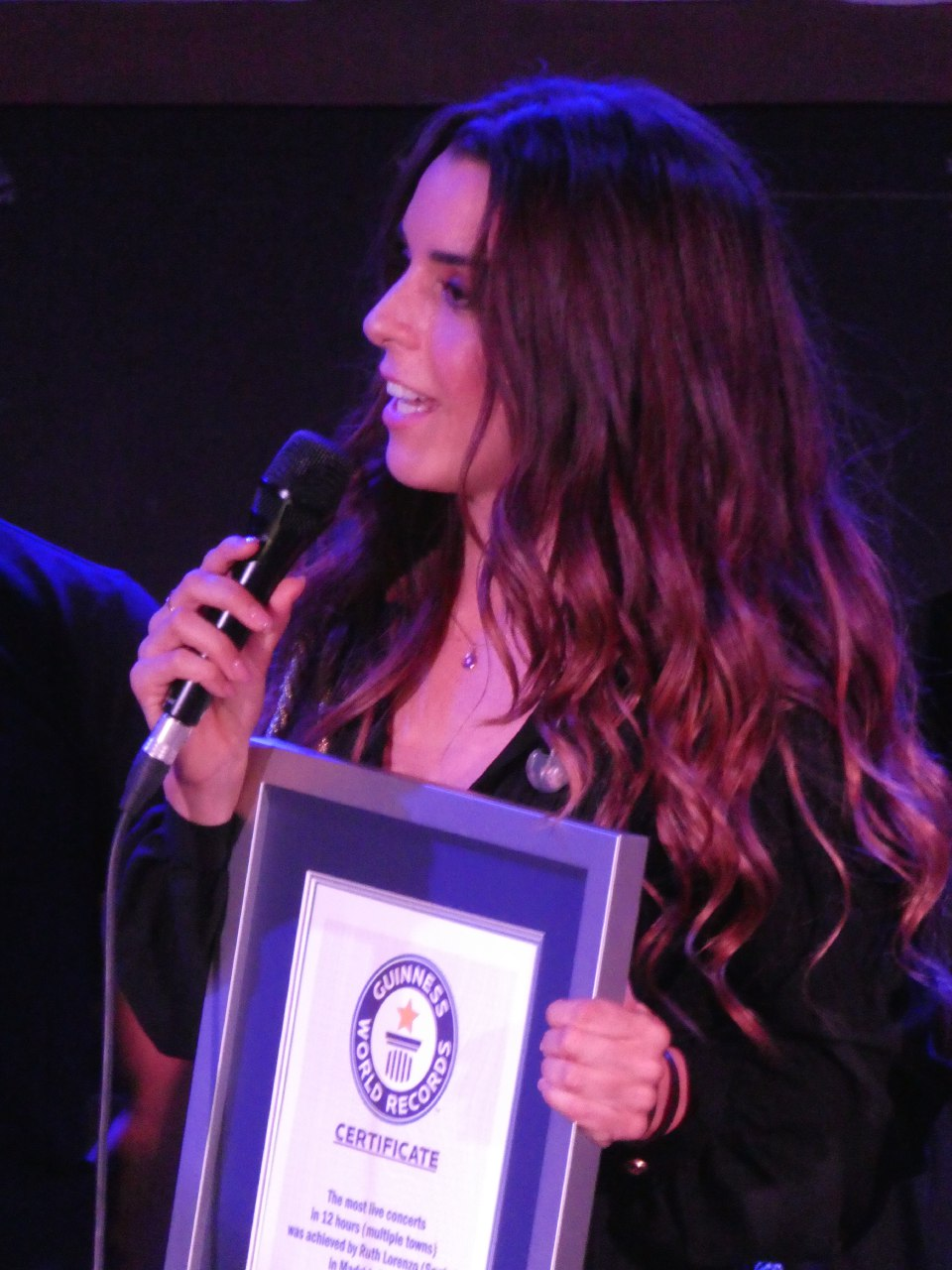
Ruth Lorenzo receiving the World Guinness Records Certificate

At the end of 2016, she started the Voces Tour touring Spain, visiting some cities as Madrid, Barcelona, Seville, Valencia and Murcia.

=== 2017: Entrepreneurial projects ===
On 13 October 2017, after a break from the music industry, Lorenzo released "Good Girls Don't Lie", the first single of her upcoming second studio album Loveaholic.

She also worked on a collaborative cover of the Spanish hit song "¿A quién le importa?", originally performed by Alaska y Dinarama, as the anthem for WorldPride Madrid 2017, with other famous Spanish singers such as Marta Sánchez, Rosa López, Vicky Larraz, La Terremoto de Alcorcón, Soraya Arnelas and Nancys Rubias, among others.

On 29 September 2017, Lorenzo announced "Good Girls Don't Lie", the first song of Loveaholic. The song was released on the 13 October 2017, reaching number one in sales on the main digital platforms such as iTunes, Google Play Music and Amazon. The song became a trending topic on Twitter during that first weekend, and it was also played on the main Spanish radio stations. Soon after that, she announced The Loveaholic Tour for 2018.

==== Record label: Raspberry Records ====
After declining an offer from Virgin EMI Records, being part of Roster Music from 2013 and releasing a charity single with Universal Music. Due to creative differences, Lorenzo decided to create her own record label, Raspberry Records, and release her music under this label.

==== White Lion ====
Lorenzo announced the creation of her own clothing line, White Lion. The name was chosen in homage to the name given to her fans (lions).

=== 2018–2019: Loveaholic, La Llamada, new single, and television projects ===
Her second album, Loveaholic, was released on 9 March 2018; the album includes a collaboration with Jeff Beck. It peaked at number 9 on the Spanish Albums Chart.

In December 2018, Lorenzo debuted in musical theatre with the role of God in La Llamada, at the Teatro Lara in Madrid.

On 29 March 2019 she performed at the sold-out Festival Mil·leni at the Teatro Coliseum in Barcelona.

In May 2019, Lorenzo starred in an episode of the La Sexta travel show Viajeras con B.

In June 2019, she released the single "Underworld". Its official music video was directed by Pablo H. Smith and produced by The Panda Bear Show.

During the summer of 2019, she toured Spain with La Llamada: Musical.

In November 2019, she starred in the multimedia event show El gran secuestro for Playz.

=== 2020–present: Crisálida, Veo cómo cantas and Hostings ===
In June 2020, Lorenzo released "Miedo", the first single from her third studio album, to be titled Crisálida. A second single that precedes the album, the same-titled "Crisálida", will be released on 29 January 2021.

In 2021, Lorenzo joined the Antena 3 music game show Veo cómo cantas (the Spanish version of I Can See Your Voice) as a panelist. In 2022, she was guest judge on season 2 of Drag Race España. Lorenzo was also a contestant on the seventh season of reality television cooking show MasterChef Celebrity.

In January 2023, she was confirmed as the main host of the RTVE singing competition series Cover Night, along with Ana Guerra and Abraham Mateo.

In January 2024, she was announced as one of the hosts of Benidorm Fest 2024, the Spanish selection for the Eurovision Song Contest 2024, alongside Marc Calderó and Ana Prada.

On 12 September 2024, she was revealed to be one of the presenters of the Junior Eurovision Song Contest 2024, along with Melani García and Marc Clotet.

Lorenzo released her third studio album, BlackSheep, on 31 October 2025 with a performance with her band.

== Discography ==
Studio albums

- Planeta Azul (2014)
- Loveaholic (2018)
- BlackSheep (2025)

Extended plays

- Burn (2011)
- The Night (2013)
- Love Is Dead (2013)
- Dancing In The Rain (Cahill Remixes) (2014)
- Renuncio (Remixes) (2015)

== Filmography ==
=== Television ===
Year	Title	Role	Notes
2008	The X Factor	Herself / contestant	5th place
2008	The Xtra Factor	Herself	
2014	Mira quién va a Eurovisión	Herself / Contestant	Winner
2014	Eurovision Song Contest 2014	Herself / Spanish entrant	10th place
2015	Levántate	Herself / Judge	
2015–2016	Tu cara me suena	Herself / Contestant	Winner
2019	El gran secuestro	Herself	Multimedia event
2020	Operación Triunfo	Herself / Stand-in Judge	1 episode
2021–2022	Veo cómo cantas	Herself / Panelist	
2022	Tu cara me suena	Herself / Stand-in Judge	1 episode
2022	Benidorm Fest 2022	Herself / Guest performer	Semi-final 2
2022	Drag Race España	Herself / Guest judge	1 episode
2022	MasterChef Celebrity	Herself / Contestant	3rd evicted
2023	Cover Night	Herself / Main host	
2024	Benidorm Fest 2024	Herself / Main host	
2024	Junior Eurovision Song Contest 2024	Herself / Main host	
2025	Benidorm Fest 2025	Herself / Main host	
2025–2026	ARIA, locos por la ópera	Herself / Main host	
2026	Mask Singer: Adivina quién canta	Herself / Panelist	
TBA	El Piano	Herself / Host	

== Guinness World Records 2016 ==
On 19 October, International Breast Cancer Awareness Day, she performed in 12 hours in eight different Spanish cities, achieving a Guinness World Record for this special cause. The name of the event was "Un récord por ellas".

== Awards and nominations ==
Year	Category	Award	Results
2008	Award nomination for Sexiest Female on a Reality TV Show	Digital Spy	Nominated
2008	Award nomination for Best Contestant on a Reality TV Show	Digital Spy	Nominated
2008	Award nomination for best moment on a Reality TV Show (singing Purple Rain when in the Bottom Two)	Digital Spy	Nominated
2009	Award nomination for Best British Single, "Hero". (X Factor 2008 Finalists — «Hero»)	Brit Award	Nominated
2014	Spanish national final for Eurovision Song Contest 2014	Mira quién va a Eurovisión (TVE)	Won
2014	"Hechicero" - Best Original Song	Goya Awards	Pre-selection
2015	"Hechicero" - Best Documentary Song	Hollywood Music Awards in Media	Nominated
2015	Ruth Lorenzo - Best Singer	Premio ESAEM	Won
2016	Un Récord Por Ellas	Guinness World Records	Won
2018	Best National Live Performance	Yudeo Awards 2018	Won
2018	Best National Front Cover "Loveaholic" by Juanka Campos	Yudeo Awards 2018	Won
2018	Bop of the year "Good Girls don't lie"	Yudeo Awards 2018	Won
2018	Best soloist with "Good Girls Don't Lie"	Yudeo Awards 2018	Won
2018	Best National Album "Loveaholic"	Yudeo Awards 2018	Won

Preceded by El Sueño de Morfeo with Contigo hasta el final	Spain in the Eurovision Song Contest; 2014	Succeeded by Edurne with Amanecer

Preceded by (France) Olivier Minne, Laury Thilleman and Ophenya	Junior Eurovision Song Contest presenter 2024; With: Marc Clotet and Melani García	Succeeded by (Georgia (country)) David Aladashvili and Liza Tsiklauri
