= Giant (disambiguation) =

A giant is a being of human appearance, sometimes of prodigious size and strength, common in folklore.

Giant(s) or The Giant(s) may also refer to:

== Arts and entertainment ==
=== Fictional characters ===
- Giants (Marvel Comics), a fictional race of people
- Giant (Dungeons & Dragons), 1974, a type of fictional character
- Judge Giant, two fictional characters in the 1977 Judge Dredd comic strip
- The Giant (Twin Peaks), an inhabitant of The Black Lodge in the 1990s television series
- Lily Duncan, also known as "Princess Giant", from the 1999 television series Mona the Vampire

=== Films ===
- The Giant (1938 film), a black-and-white Japanese film based on the novel Les Misérables
- Giant (1956 film), an epic drama adaptation of Ferber's novel
- Giant (2009 film), a Uruguayan comedy drama
- The Giant (2016 film), a Danish-Swedish drama
- Giant (2017 film), a Basque-language Spanish drama
- The Giant (2019 film), a French-American film
- Giant (2025 film), a British sports drama about boxer Naseem Hamed
- The Giants (2011 film), a Belgian drama
- The Giants (2023 film), an Australian documentary about environmentalist Bob Brown

=== Games ===
- Giants: Citizen Kabuto, a 2000 third-person shooter game
- Skylanders: Giants, a 2012 beat-em-up game
- Giants (Mayfair Games), a 1987 supplement for role-playing games

=== Literature and periodicals ===
- The Giant, an 1871 novel by William Sewell
- The Giants, a 1905 novel by Cora Baggerly Older
- The Giant, a 1951 novel by Frederick Manfred
- Giant, a 1952 novel by Edna Ferber
- The Giant, a 1954 children's novel by William Pène du Bois
- The Giants (novel), 1973, by J. M. G. Le Clézio
- Giants (series), a 1977 science fiction series by James P. Hogan
- "giANTS", a 1979 short story by Edward Bryant
- Giants (anthology), a 1985 short story collection
- Giant (magazine), a 2004 American urban music magazine

=== Music ===
==== Albums ====
- Giant (Buddy Holly album), 1969
- Giants (Dizzy Gillespie album), 1971
- The Giant (Dizzy Gillespie album), 1973
- The Giants (album), by Oscar Peterson, Joe Pass, and Ray Brown, 1974
- Giant (The Woodentops album), 1986
- Giant (Herman Düne album) or the title song, 2006
- Giants (Chicane album) or the title song, 2010
- Giants (Evan Craft album) or the title song, 2012
- The Giant (Ahab album) or the title song, 2012
- Giants (The Stranglers album) or the title song, 2012
- Giants (Andreya Triana album) or the title song, 2015
- Giants, by Daniel Powter, 2018
- Giant (Stray Kids album), 2024

==== Songs ====
- "Giant", by Gentle Giant from Gentle Giant, 1970
- "Giant", by Stan Rogers from Fogarty's Cove, 1977
- "Giant", by The The from Soul Mining, 1983
- "Giant", by the Matthew Good Band from Beautiful Midnight, 1999
- "Giant", by Nebula from Charged, 2001
- "Giant", by Vampire Weekend from Contra, 2010
- "Giant", by Funeral Party from The Golden Age of Knowhere, 2011
- "Giant", by Banks & Steelz from Anything But Words, 2016
- "Giant" (Calvin Harris and Rag'n'Bone Man song), 2019
- "Giant", by Yuqi from A Page, 2021
- "Giant", by Stray Kids from Giant, 2024
- "Giants" (Bear Hands song), 2013
- "Giants" (Dermot Kennedy song), 2020
- "Giants", by Helloween from Chameleon, 1993
- "Giants", by Imagine Dragons from Mercury – Act 1, 2021
- "Giants", by Josh Osho, 2012
- "Giants" (Lights song), 2017
- "Giants", by One Ok Rock from Eye of the Storm, 2019
- "Giants", by Scale the Summit from Carving Desert Canyons, 2009
- "Giants", by Sponge from Rotting Piñata, 1994
- "Giants" (Take That song), 2017
- "Giants", by True Damage, a virtual hip-hop group featuring Becky G, 2019
- "Giants", by X Ambassadors from The Reason
- "The Giant", by Swallow the Sun from Ghosts of Loss, 2005
- "The Giant", by Anthrax from Worship Music, 2011

==== Record labels ====
- Giant Records, a former American label, now a Swedish branch of Warner Music Group
- Giant Records (independent), a former American independent label

==== Other uses in music ====
- The Giant (opera), a c. 1900 opera by Sergei Prokofiev
- Giant (musical), 2009, adaptation of Ferber's novel
- Giant (band), a 1987 American rock band

=== Plays ===
- Giant (play), 2024, by Mark Rosenblatt

=== Television ===
- The Giants, an unproduced 1960s Doctor Who television serial
- "The Giant", a 1964 episode of The Mighty Hercules
- "The Giant" (Bagpuss), a 1974 episode
- The Giants (TV series), a 1978 Hong Kong drama series
- "Giants" (Zoboomafoo), a 1999 episode
- Giant (TV series), a 2010 South Korean historical drama series
- "Giant" (Halt and Catch Fire), a 2014 episode

== Brands and enterprises ==
- Giant Bicycles, bicycle maker
- GIANT Company Software, internet security developer
- Giant Food (disambiguation)
- Giant Hypermarket, a retail chain in Southeast Asia
- Giant Industries, a defunct oil company and convenience store chain in the U.S. Southwest now succeeded by Speedway
- Grenoble Innovation for Advanced New Technologies (GIANT), an innovation campus in Polygone Scientifique in Grenoble, France

== People ==
- Giant Baba and Baba the Giant, two of the ring names of Japanese professional wrestler Shohei Baba (1938–1999)
- André the Giant (1946–1993), French wrestler and actor
- Giant Haystacks (1947–1998), a ring name of English professional wrestler Martin Austin Ruane (1946–1998)
- Giant Silva, a ring name of Brazilian basketball player, mixed martial arts fighter, and wrestler Paulo César da Silva (born 1963)
- Giant González, a ring name of Argentine professional wrestler Jorge González (1966–2010)
- The Giant (wrestler) (born 1972), a ring name of American wrestler Paul Wight
- Paulo da Silva (born 1980), Paraguayan football player nicknamed "Giant"
- Ryan Wedding (born 1981), Canadian drug trafficker nicknamed "Giant"

== Places in the United States ==
- Giant, Richmond, California, a former unincorporated community
- Giant Forest, Sequoia National Park, California
- Giant Rock, Mohave Desert, California
- Giant Springs, near Great Falls, Montana
- Giant Mountain, New York
- Giant Geyser, Yellowstone National Park, Wyoming

== Sports ==
=== Teams ===
==== Asia ====
- Lotte Giants, a South Korean baseball team
- Yomiuri Giants, a Japanese baseball team
- Gujarat Giants (disambiguation), various sports teams in Gujarat, India
- Gulf Giants, an Emirati cricket team, affiliated with Gujarat Giants of WPL

==== Australia ====
- Gold Coast-Tweed Giants, a rugby league team
- Goldfields Giants, a State Basketball League team
- Greater Western Sydney Giants, an Australian Football League team nicknamed the "Giants"

==== Europe ====
- Antwerp Giants, a Belgian basketball club
- Bayer Giants Leverkusen, a German basketball club
- Belfast Giants, an Irish EIHL ice hockey team
- Dortmund Giants, an American football club from Dortmund, Germany
- Giants Bolzano, an American football club competing in the Italian Football League
- Huddersfield Giants, an English rugby league team competing in Super League
- Manchester Giants, a British Basketball League team
- SG ART Giants Düsseldorf, a German basketball team

==== North America ====
===== Negro league baseball =====
- Bacharach Giants, Atlantic City, New Jersey
- Baltimore Elite Giants
- Brooklyn Royal Giants
- Chicago Giants
- Chicago Columbia Giants
- Chicago Union Giants (disambiguation)
- Chicago American Giants
- Cleveland Giants
- Cuban Giants, Trenton, New Jersey
- Harrisburg Giants
- Illinois Giants
- Leland Giants, Chicago, Illinois
- Lincoln Giants, New York City
- Page Fence Giants, Adrian, Michigan
- Philadelphia Giants
- St. Louis Giants

===== Other sports in north america =====
- Jacksonville Giants, a minor league basketball team
- Fort McMurray Giants, a baseball team in the Western Canadian Baseball League
- New York Giants (disambiguation), in various sports and eras
  - New York Giants, a National Football League team
- San Francisco Giants, a Major League Baseball team
  - Arizona League Giants, their AZL minor league affiliate
  - San Jose Giants, their High-A minor league affiliate
- Vancouver Giants, a Western Hockey League team

=== Other uses in sports ===
- Giant (gymnastics), an artistic gymnastics skill
- Giant Center, an arena in Hershey, Pennsylvania, US
- Giants Gaming, a Spanish/European eSports team

== Other uses ==
- GIANT AntiSpyware, a software application
- Giant Mine, a gold mine in the Northwest Territories, Canada
- S-300V "Antey-300" (NATO reporting name SA-12B "Giant")
- Giants (esotericism), in esoteric and occult teachings, beings who live on spiritual, etheric and physical planes of existence
- A Bank of England £1,000,000 note, nicknamed "Giant"
- Atlas Air, an airline (callsign "Giant")

== See also ==
- Giant planet, a type of planet
- Giant star, a type of star
- Supergiant (disambiguation)
- Processional giant, costumed tall figures
- Eddie Carmel (1936–1972), Israeli-born entertainer known as "The Jewish Giant" and "The Happy Giant"
- Project Riese (German for "giant"), the code name for a construction project of Nazi Germany (1943–45)
- Geant (disambiguation)
- Gigantism
