= Geant =

Geant may refer to:

- Giant puppet festivals:
  - Géant du Nord, Nord-Pas-de-Calais, France
  - Philippines: Higantes Festival
  - Venlo: Valuas (folklore) § Giant puppets
- Géant, an international hypermarket chain based in France
- Géant Uruguay
- GÉANT, a European computer network for research and education
- Dent du Géant, a mountain in the Alps
- GEANT, acronym for GEometry ANd Tracking, a series of software toolkit platforms developed by CERN
  - GEANT-3
  - Geant4
- Géant Ferré, French language name of André the Giant

== See also ==
- Les géants (disambiguation), film and novel
