= Supermercados El Dorado =

Uruguayan supermarket chain

El Dorado
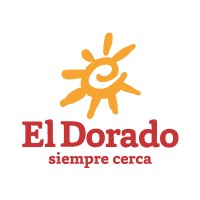

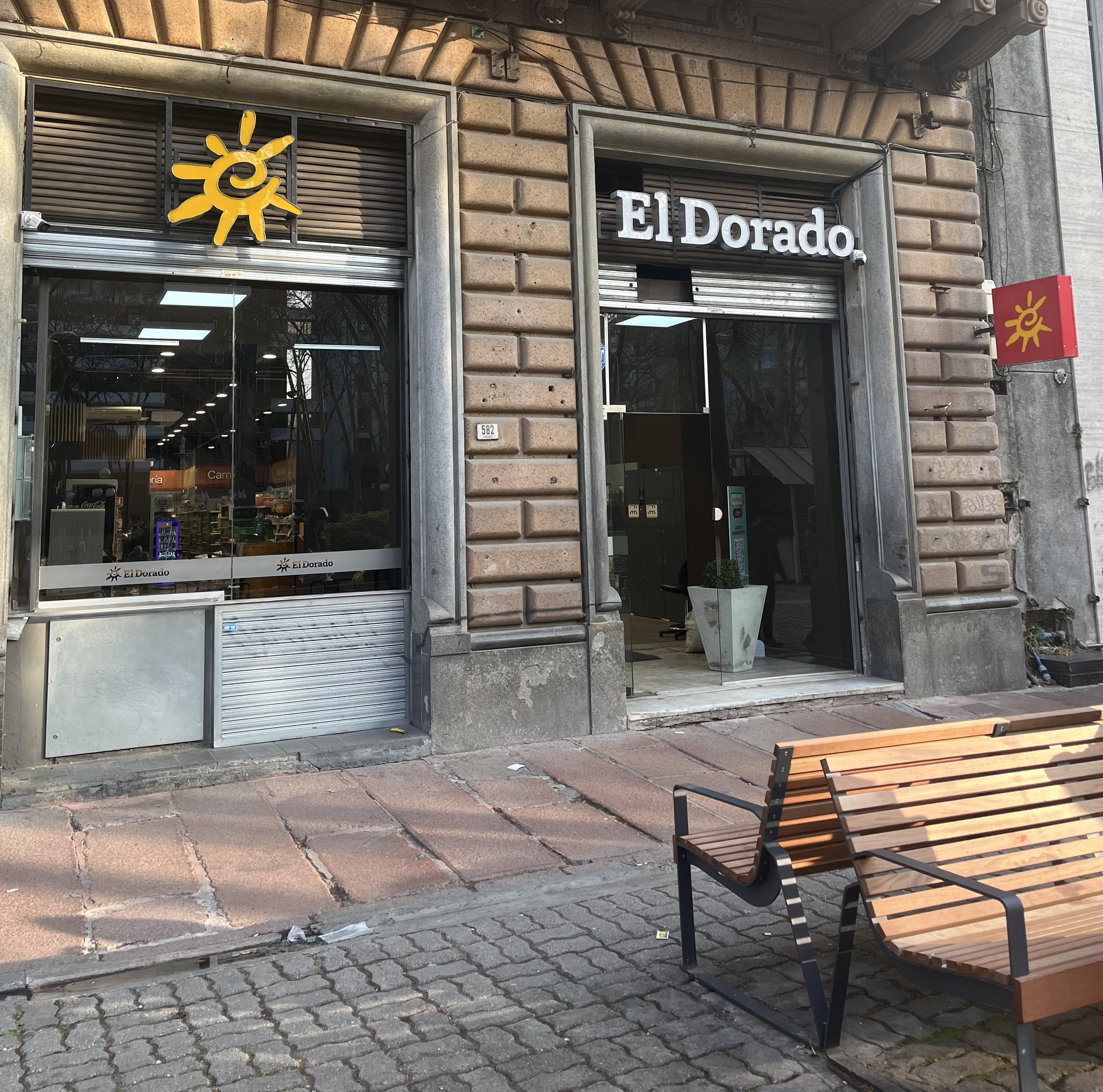
- El Dorado supermarket in Ciudad Vieja in 2024.
- Formation: 1 January 1961; 65 years ago
- Founder: Tobías Polakof
- Type: S.A.
- Location(s): Ruta 39, Km. 7,200, Maldonado, Uruguay
- Owner: Polakof y Cía S.A.
- Website: El Dorado

El Dorado is a supermarket chain from Uruguay, founded in 1929, which has seventy two stores.

== History ==
Founded in Maldonado in 1929 by the Ukrainian immigrant Tobías Polakof, it was the first supermarket in the interior of Uruguay. It is a family business with Uruguayan capital, owned by the firm Polakof y Cía S.A.. Tito Polakf brought the idea of the supermarket back from a trip and set up the first one on 18 of July 877 Street, half a block from Plaza San Fernando in Maldonado.

In 2022, El Dorado expanded to Colonia and in 2023 to Montevideo; it also has seventy branches distributed in the departments of Canelones, Cerro Largo, Lavalleja, Maldonado, Rocha, San José, Tacuarembó, Florida, Soriano, Paysandú, Río Negro and Treinta y Tres.

In 2024 El Dorado opened its first hypermarket in Montevideo.

== Branches ==
As of January 2025, Supermercados El Dorado operated in 15 departments of Uruguay. The following is a list of branches documented in contemporary sources.

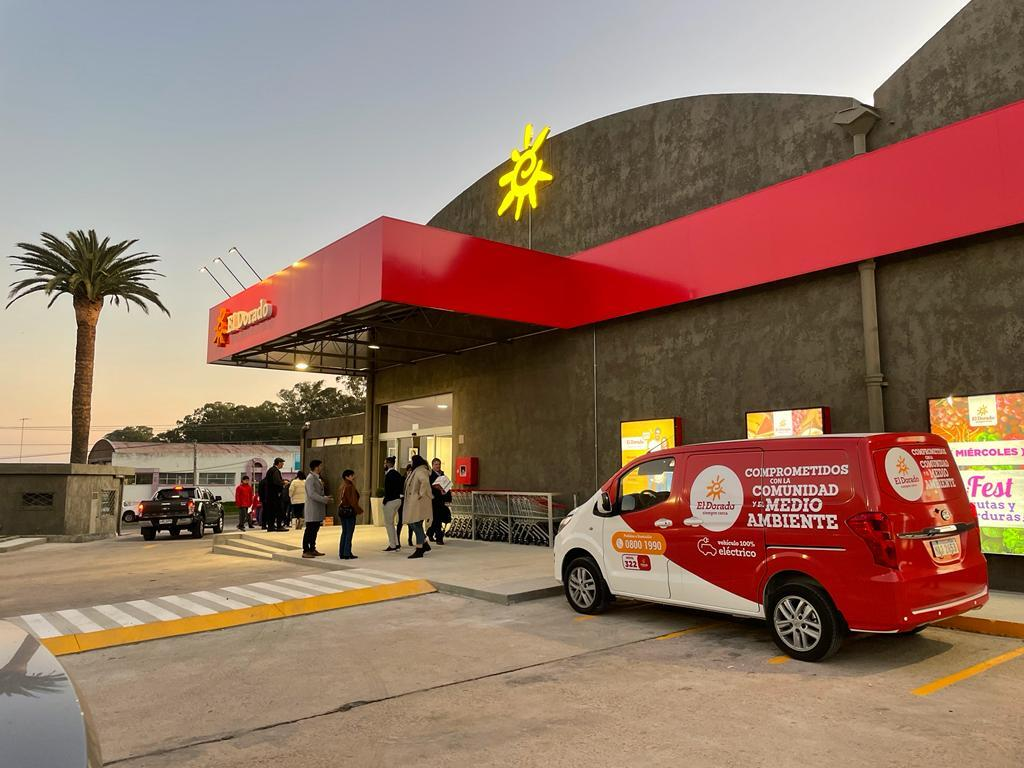
El Dorado Colonia supermarket.

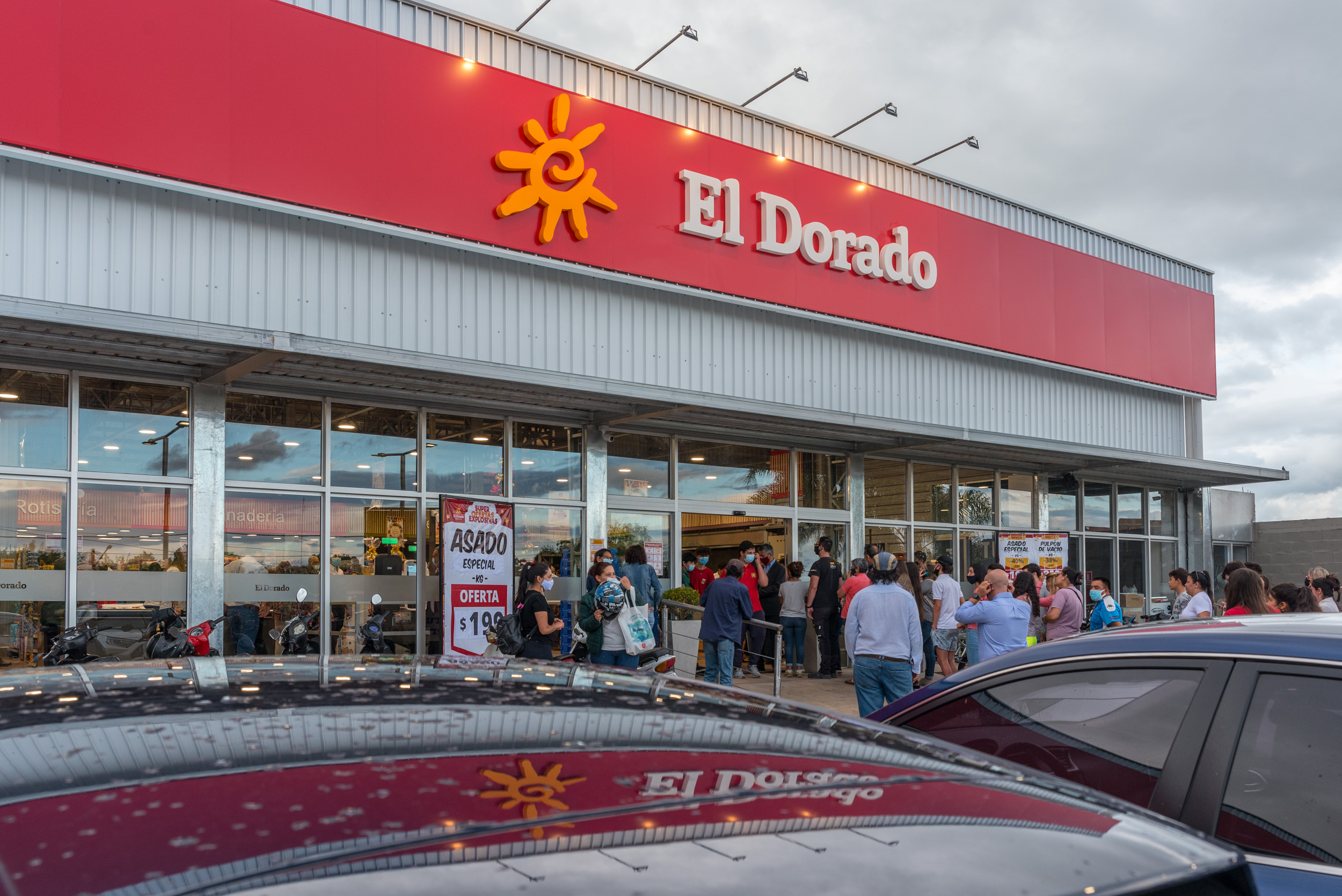
Supermercado El Dorado Paysandú.

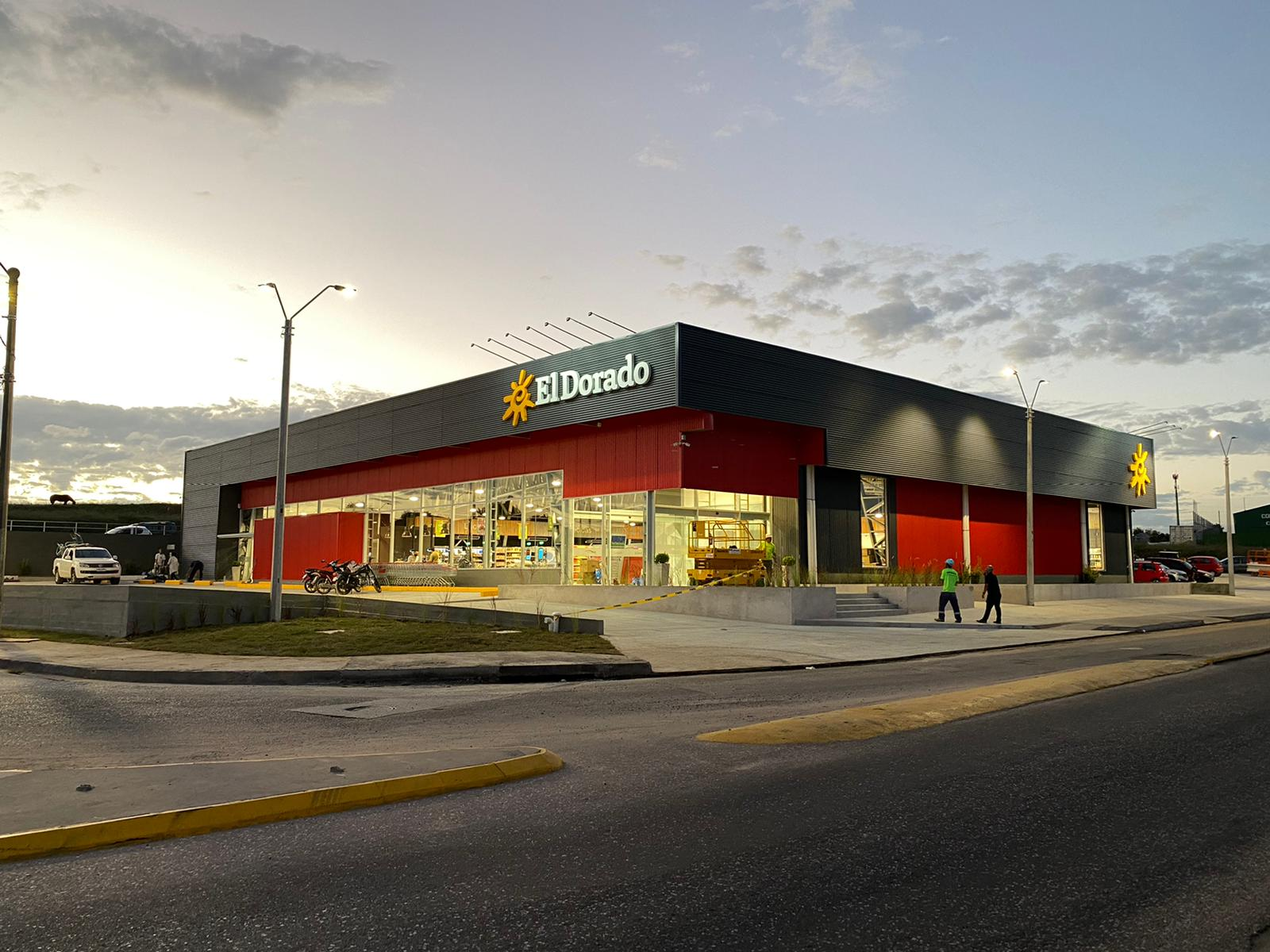
El Dorado Maldonado Supermarket in 2021.

N.º	Branches	Location
Maldonado
1	Dodera 882	Maldonado
2	Aiguá and Monterroso av.	Maldonado
3	Batlle y Ordóñez and Mitre av.	Maldonado
4	Tacuarembó and bulevar Artigas	Maldonado
5	Lussich and Messina av.	Maldonado
6	Tobias Polakof and Joaquín de Viana	Maldonado
7	Cuchilla de India Muerta and Tupambaé	Maldonado
8	General Leandro Gómez and Lima av.	Maldonado
9	Francisco Martínez, corner Cno. de los Gauchos	Maldonado
10	Ruta 10	Maldonado
11	Francia Parada 2 av.	Punta del Este
12	Calle 29 and Gorlero	Punta del Este
13	Ruta 10 and Ruta 12	Maldonado
14	Ruta 39 and Perimetral	Maldonado
15	25 de Agosto and Sarandí	San Carlos
16	Av. Ceberio and Rincón	Maldonado
17	W. Ferreira Aldunate av., corner Isla Canarias	Maldonado
18	Félix de Lizarza 775	Pan de Azúcar
19	Piria y Tucumán av.	Piriápolis
20	Simón del Pino y Misiones	Piriápolis
21	Ruta 10 y Las Violetas	Las Flores
22	Gral. de la Llana and M. Muniz	Aiguá
23	Barreiro parada 28 av.	Balneario Solís
24	Calle 49 and Calle 25	Balneario Argentino
25	Gabriel Pereira and Maúa	Piriápolis
26	Dodera near Ituzaingó	Maldonado (Terra Bio)
27	Virazón	Punta del Este
Montevideo
28	18 de Julio de 2006 corner Dr. Pablo de María	Cordón
29	18 de Julio de 1807 corner Dr. Tristán Narvaja	Cordón
30	Yí 1369 corner 18 de Julio	Centro
31	Sarandí 584	Ciudad Vieja
32	Garibaldi av. corner Monte Caseros	La Blanqueada
Lavalleja
33	Morales Arrillaga 757	Minas
34	Luis Alberto de Herrera 515	Minas
35	18 de Julio and Claudio Williman	Minas
36	Dr. Podestá Carnelli, corner Rivera	José Pedro Varela
Cerro Largo
37	Justino Muñíz and Herrera	Melo
38	Route 26, corner of General Agustín Muñoz	Melo
39	Virrey Arredondo and Vapor Cebollati	Río Branco
Treinta y Tres
40	Basilio Araujo 1067	Treinta y Tres
41	Enrique Rodó 1559	Treinta y Tres
42	Manuel Melendez and Juan Rosas	Treinta y Tres
Rocha
43	Ruta 9 km 207	Rocha
44	General Artigas 1069	Rocha
45	Nicolás Solari av. and Antares	La Paloma
46	Solari av. and Sirio	La Paloma
47	Sagitario av. and Alfa	La Paloma
48	Ruta 10 and calle principal	La Pedrera
49	Arachanes 559	Chuy
50	25 de Agosto and Rincón	Lascano
Canelones
51	Instrucciones del año XIII, 609 av.	Las Piedras
52	Mario Ferreira between calle D and E	Las Toscas
53	Charrúas and General Artigas	La Tuna
54	Rivera and Artigas	Santa Lucía
55	De los Médanos and Paralela al Sur	Médanos de Solymar
56	Paralela Sur and Congreso de Tres Cruces	San José de Carrasco
San José
57	Río de la Plata av. and Ruta 1	Playa Pascual
58	Ituzaingó between Asamblea and Ciganda	San José de Mayo
Tacuarembó
59	Carlos Berrutti av. between Manuel Oribe and Gral. Artigas	Paso de los Toros
60	Florencio Sánchez, corner Ángela B. de López	Paso de los Toros
Florida
61	Libertad 1034, between Avda. Artigas and Treinta y Tres	Sarandí Grande
Soriano
62	Carlos Puig and Dr. Adalberto Schuster	Dolores
63	Colón corner Eusebio Giménez	Mercedes
64	Libertad corner Florencio Sánchez	Cardona
Paysandú
65	General Artigas av. corner Salto	Paysandú
Río Negro
66	Zorrilla de San Martín, corner Enrique Beaulieu	Fray Bentos
Colonia
67	Batlle y Ordóñez av. and Ruta 21	Carmelo
68	Argentina and José Enrique Rodó	Nueva Palmira
Durazno
69	Dr. Luis Morquio, between Manuel Oribe and Eusebio Piriz	City of Durazno.

== Services ==
- El Dorado Credit Card
- Gift Card
- Home delivery orders

== Stores ==
As of January 2025, El Dorado has four branches; one in Maldonado, another in Lavalleja (Minas), another in Treinta y Tres and another in Rocha (Lascano).

== See also ==
- Hipermercado Géant
- Disco

== Bibliography ==
- 2013, Un hombre solidario (A caring man) by Ana Clara Polakof. (ISBN 978-9974-98-926-9)
