= Tina Havelock Stevens =

Australian artist (born 1967)

- Born: Sydney, Australia
- Known for: Documentary Music Video art
- Notable work: Thunderhead (2016), Giant Rock (2017), The Rapids (2018)
- Movement: Post-punk
- Awards: Fisher's Ghost Prize (2017), Blake Prize (2018)

Tina Havelock Stevens is an Australian multi disciplinary artist known for her drumming, documentaries, and video works. She often combines improvised live music performances with striking locations that explore the spirituality of place.

== Music ==
Havelock Stevens played drums in a number of Australian post-punk rock bands, notably Plug Uglies, with whom she recorded the EPs Knock Me Your Lobes (1989) and Johnny Panic (1990). and The Titanics with whom she recorded the albums Love is the Devil (2000) and Size Isn't Everything (2000). She also played with Chicks on Speed and Crow. She co-founded the largely instrumental ensemble The Mumps, who featured on Triple J unearthed and with whom she recorded the EP I Wish I was You (2018).

== Art ==
In 2017 Havelock Stevens won the regional Fisher's Ghost Art Award from Campbelltown City Council and came to national attention the following year when she won the 65th Blake Prize for work exploring spirituality, with her video work 'Giant Rock'. The video was made at Landers, California in the Mojave Desert and features her drumming before Giant Rock one of the largest freestanding boulders in the world; a site she described as a "spiritual vortex".

That same year she travelled to the Philippines to drum on a river to make her work 'Beats of Darkness' for the Manila Biennale, Philippines. Part of that work was reconfigured in her dual channel work 'The Rapids' exhibited in The National 2019: New Australian Art at the Museum of Contemporary Art Australia.

In 2020 she exhibited in 'Afterglow' at the Yokohama Triennale, Japan.

In 2022 she has been commissioned to produce a work for the inaugural exhibition at the new Bundanon museum built at the former home of Australian artist Arthur Boyd in Shoalhaven, New South Wales.

Within Australia, she has also been exhibited by Canberra Museum and Gallery, Canberra, Museum of Old and New Art, Hobart, Gertrude Contemporary Art Spaces, Melbourne, Perth Institute of Contemporary Arts, Perth and Art Gallery of New South Wales, Sydney.

== Reviews ==
Art critic Elizabeth Pearce described Havelock Stevens' practice as uniting her craft as a filmmaker and musician "for the purposes of creating… something else, something greater than the sum of those parts. The opportunity, perhaps, to occupy a particular moment in time and space, that’s consonant with the history and politics of ‘occupation’, but nonetheless determined to privilege the human propensity for peace and acceptance that persists beneath all the social and historical change".

== Selected work ==
- 'THUNDERHEAD', 2016
- 'Giant Rock', 2017
- 'The Rapids', 2018 Two channel digital video with 5.1 Sound
- 'Hasta La Bella Vista Baby', 2019 Single channel HD Video with Stereo Sound
- 'Holus Bolus', 2020, Gold Neon
