= Valuas =

Valuas can refer to

- Valuas (folklore) - Folklore figures from Venlo
- Valuas (restaurant) - Michelin starred restaurant in Venlo
