= Food Giant =

Food Giant may refer to:

- Food Giant (UK retailer), a defunct supermarket chain owned by Somerfield
- Food Giant (Missouri retailer), an American chain owned by Houchens Industries

== See also ==
- Giant Food (disambiguation)
