= Integratron =

- U.S. National Register of Historic Places
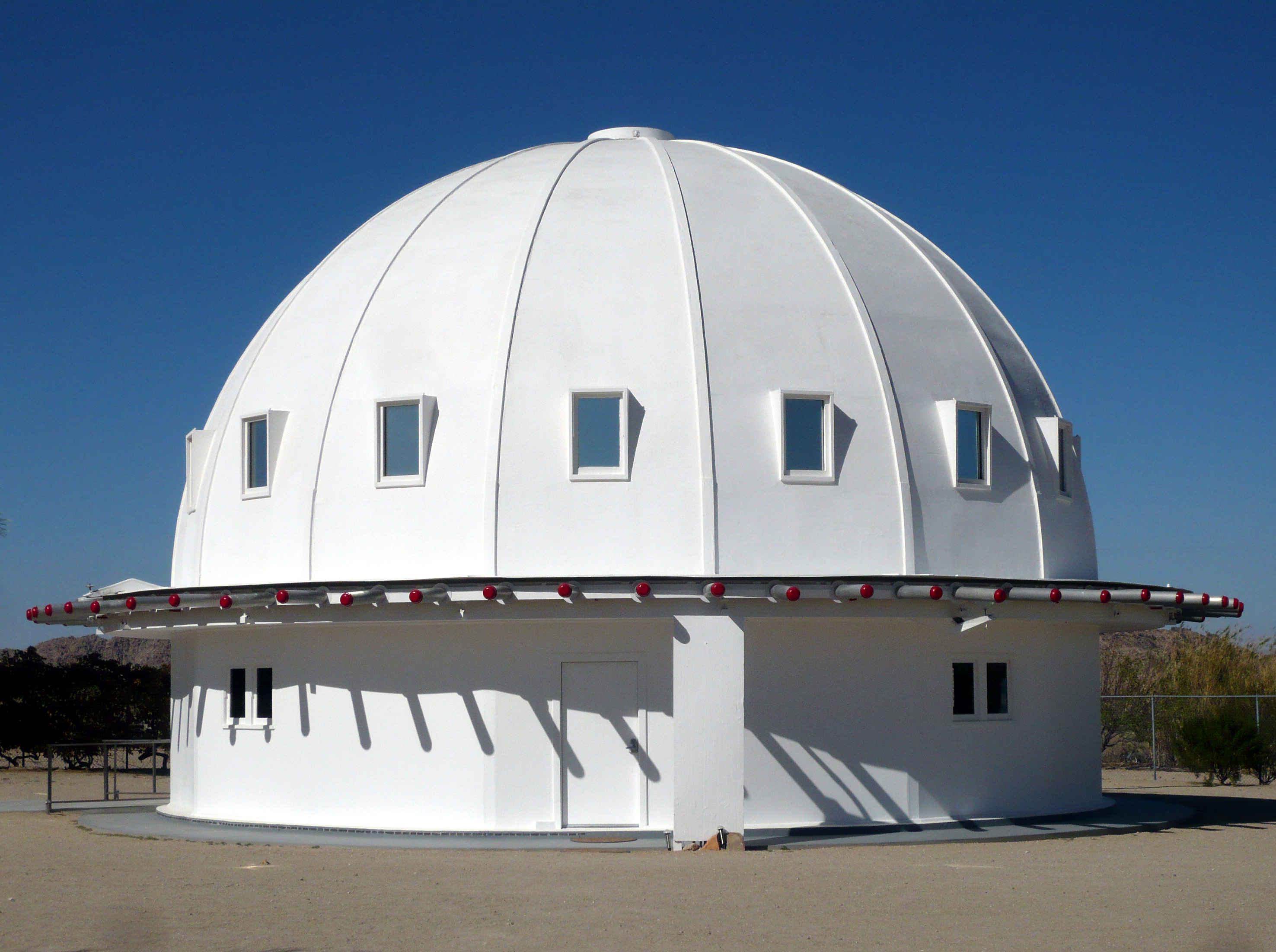
- The Integratron in October, 2017
- Location: 2477 Belfield Boulevard, Landers, California
- Coordinates: 34°17′40″N 116°24′13″W
- Built: 1960
- Architect: George Van Tassel, Howard P. Hess
- NRHP reference No.: 100002317
- Added to NRHP: April 23, 2018

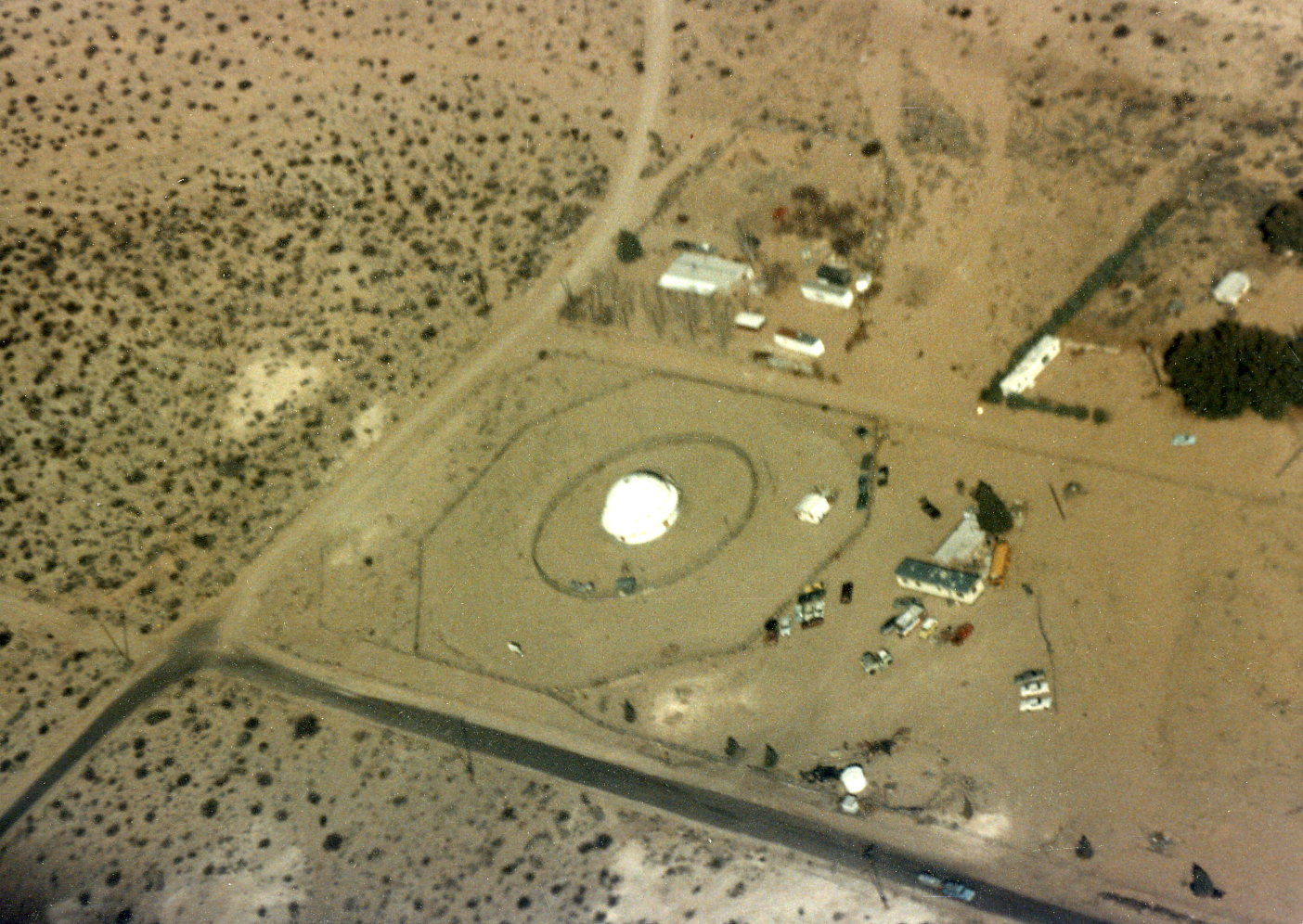
Overflight of The Integratron, June 1975

The Integratron is a 38-foot-tall (12 m) cupola structure with a diameter of 55 feet (17 m) designed by ufologist and contactee George Van Tassel. Van Tassel claimed the Integratron was capable of rejuvenation, anti-gravity and time travel. He built the structure in Landers, California (near Joshua Tree), following instructions that Van Tassel vehemently claimed were provided directly to him by visitors from the planet Venus. The Integratron machine was started in 1957, the structure erected in 1959. It was financed predominantly by donations, including funds from Howard Hughes.

After Van Tassel's death in 1978, the building had a series of owners (and was left in various states of disrepair) before sisters Joanne, Nancy, and Patty Karl bought it in the early 2000s. The sisters promote the Integratron as an "acoustically perfect structure", and offer "sound baths" they describe as "...meditation-like sessions accompanied by tones from 22 quartz crystal bowls, creating binaural beats for relaxation and rejuvenation". The building is now a part of the National Historic Register, and continues to be stewarded by the Karl sisters and their adult children.

== Construction ==
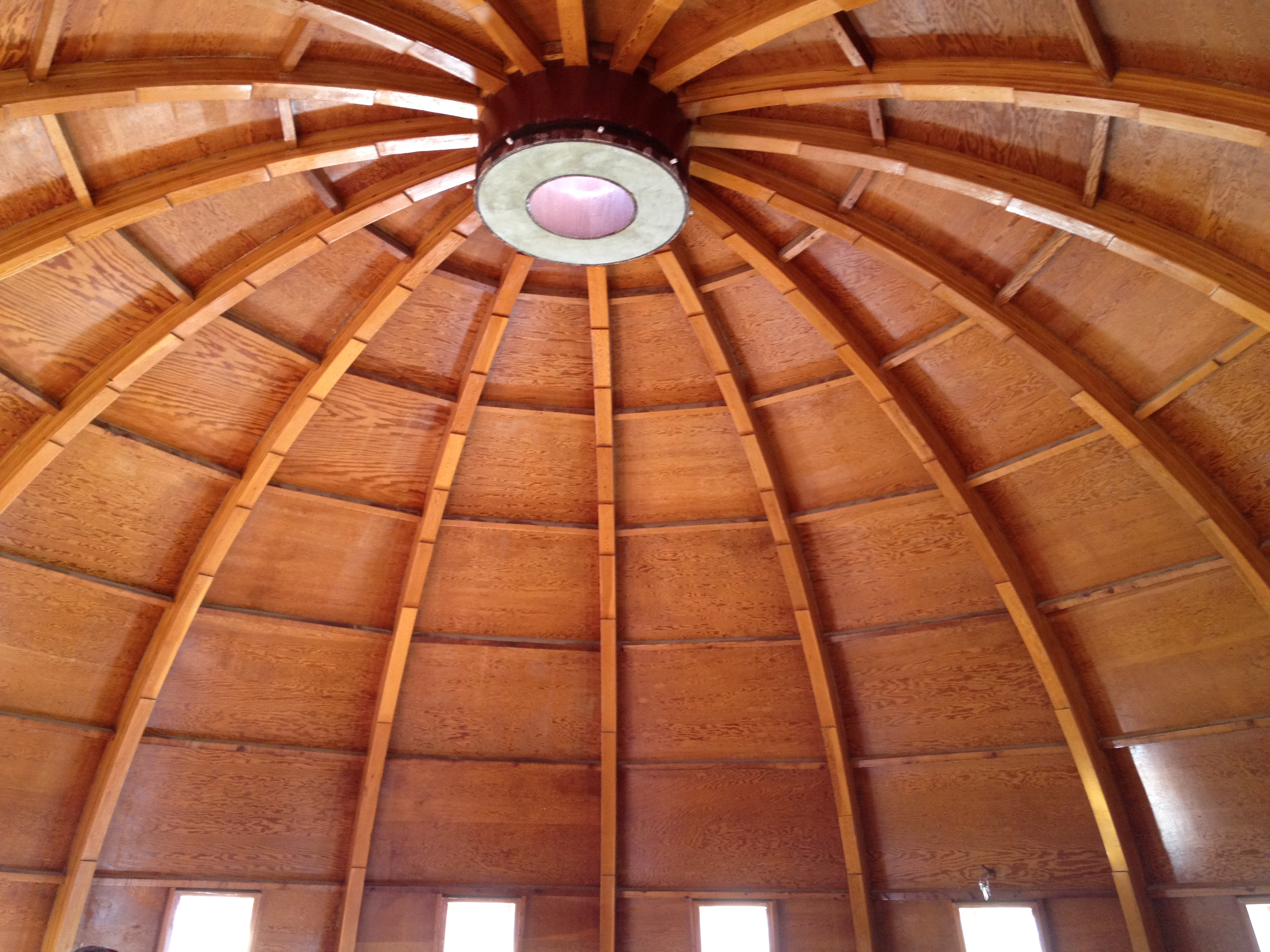
Ceiling of the Integratron, January 2012

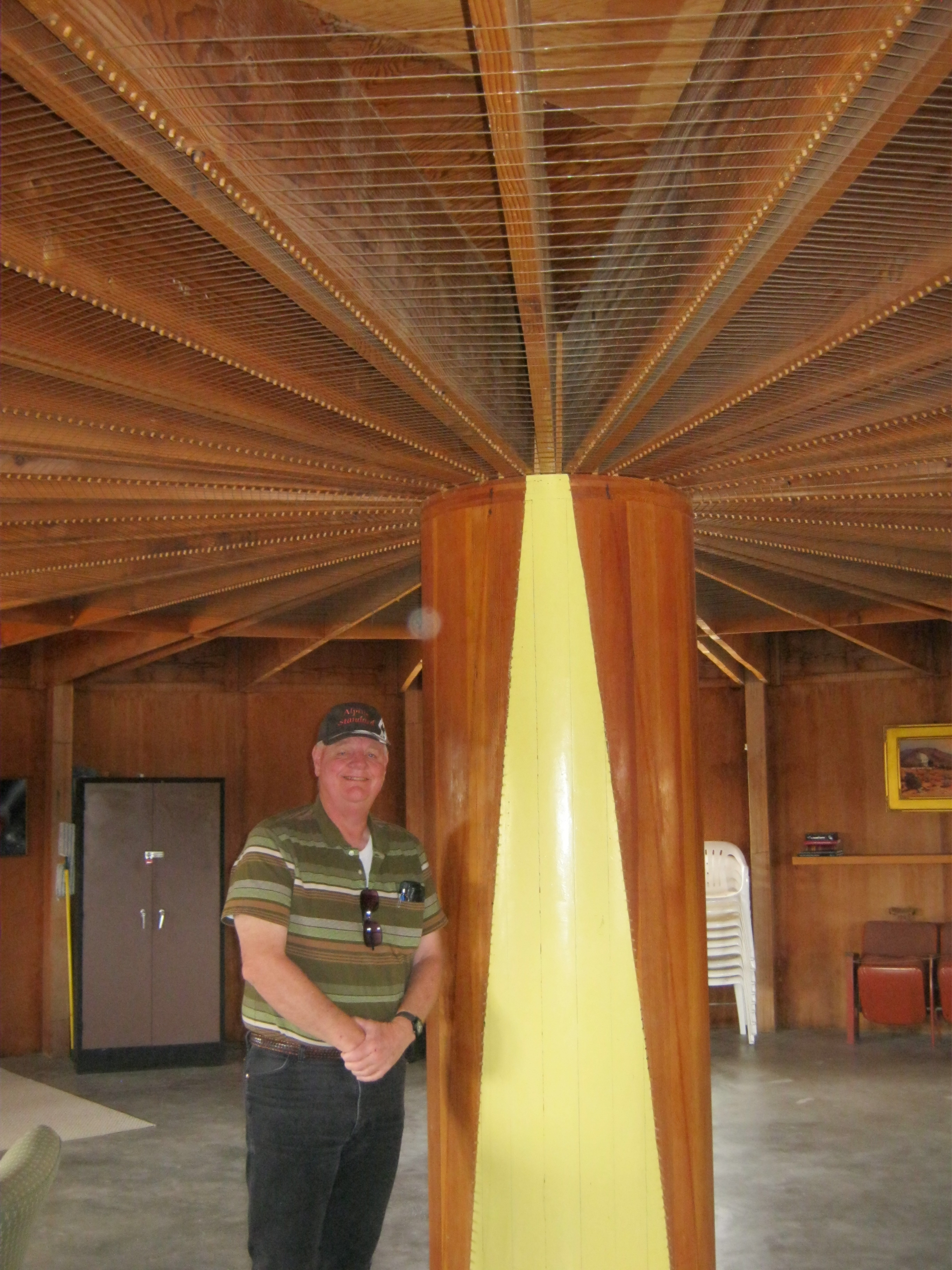
Support post and bare copper wire spiral on ground floor ceiling

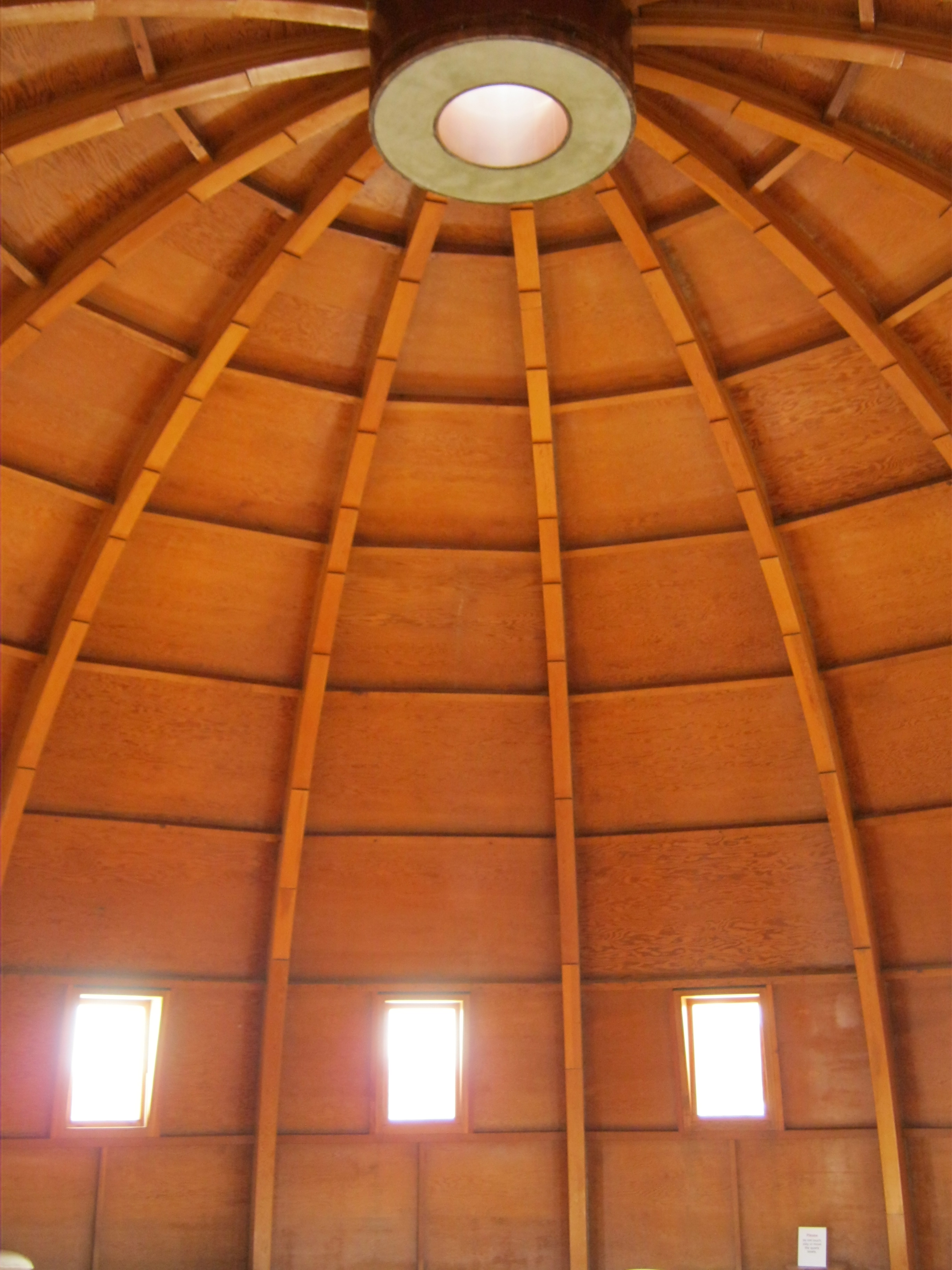
Second floor ceiling with sky light

George Van Tassel was a former aircraft mechanic and flight inspector who moved to California's Mojave Desert to operate an airport and inn. While there, he began meditating under Giant Rock, which the Native Americans of the area held sacred. In August 1953, Van Tassel claimed he had been contacted both telepathically and later in person by people from space, who gave him a technique to rejuvenate human cell tissue. Acting on these instructions, Van Tassel began constructing the Integratron in 1954. Construction costs were partly paid for by an annual series of successful UFO conventions, the Giant Rock Spacecraft Conventions, which continued for nearly 25 years. The main structure's construction was complete circa 1959, but Van Tassel continued to work on the device until his sudden death in 1978.

== Claims ==
According to Van Tassel, the Integratron's workings rely on the generation of strong "intermittent magnetic fields" resulting in the generation of plasma in the form of a coronal discharge and negative air ionization inside the building. The Integratron is based on the Multiple Wave Oscillator, invented by Georges Lakhovsky, a combination of a high voltage Tesla coil and a split-ring resonator that generates ultra wideband electromagnetic frequencies (EMF). Van Tassel speculated that electromagnetism affects biological cells, and believed that every biological cell has a unique resonant EMF. According to van Tassel, the generation of strong ultra wideband EMF by the Integratron "resonates" with the cell's frequency and "recharges" the cellular structure as if it were an electrical battery. Van Tassel claimed that human cells "rejuvenated" while inside the structure. Van Tassel also claimed the Integratron is intentionally constructed atop a powerful geomagnetic anomaly and its construction is entirely of non-ferromagnetic materials, the equivalent to a modern radome.

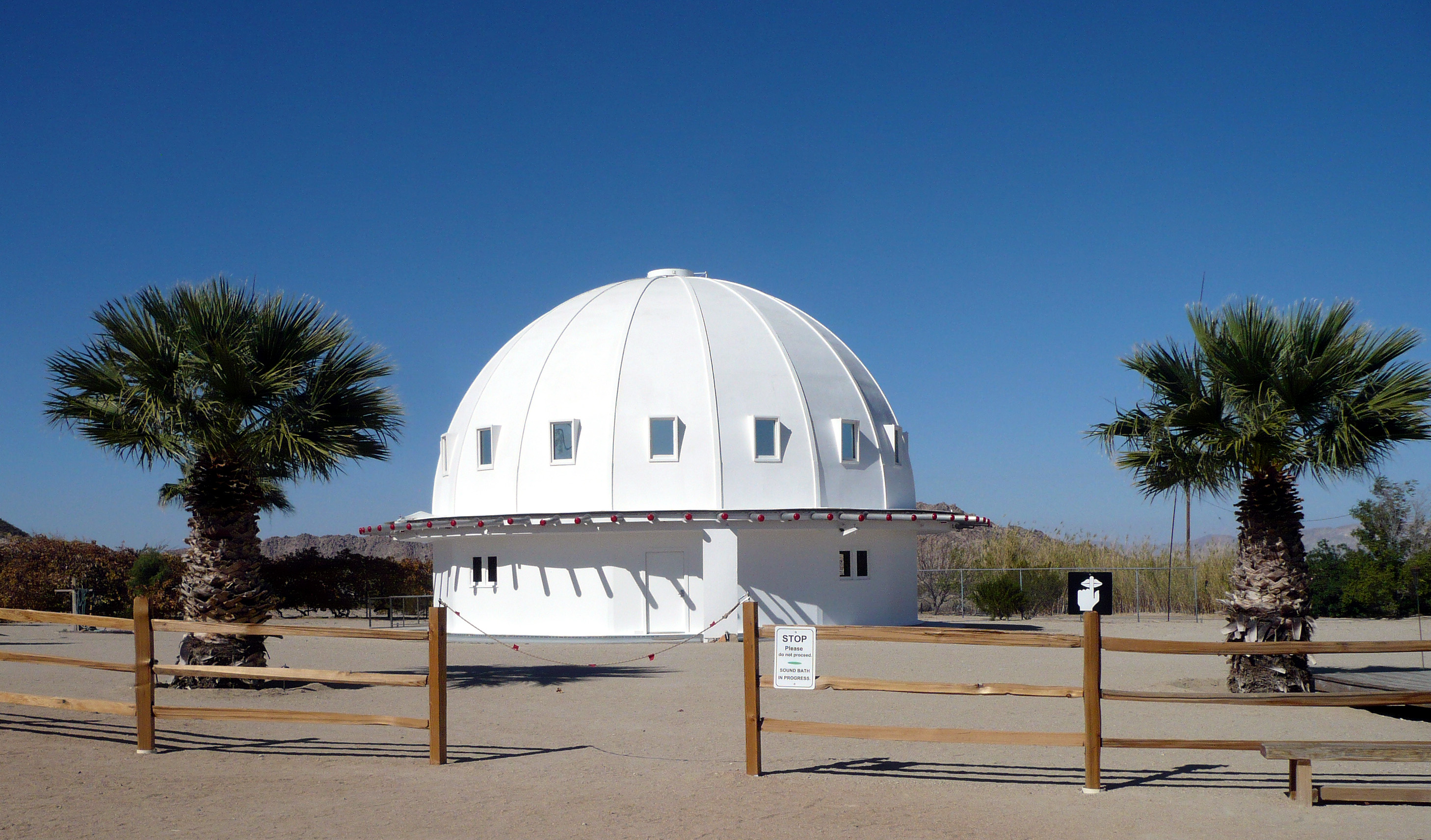
The Integratron in 2017

== Modern uses ==
After Van Tassel died, there was a proposal to turn the Integratron into a disco, but that plan was never realized. The Integratron's new owners operate it as a tourist attraction and offer "sound baths" where groups of people are "exposed to harmonic sound frequencies" produced by quartz bowls, claimed to have a deep calming effect. According to one of the structure's docents, the Integratron is an "acoustically perfect sound chamber".

The Integratron was added to the National Register of Historic Places in April 2018.

The English indie rock band Arctic Monkeys recorded part of their song "Secret Door" at the Integratron in 2008.

== See also ==
- Orgone
