= Les géants =

Les géants may refer to:

- Les géants (film), a 2011 film
- Les Géants (novel), a 1973 novel
