= Giant Food =

Giant Food may refer to:

- Giant Food (Landover), also known as Giant Food of Maryland, LLC, a division of Ahold Delhaize
- Giant Food Stores, also known as The Giant Company, a division of Ahold Delhaize

== See also ==
- Food Giant (disambiguation)
- Giant Hypermarket
- Giant Markets, a former grocery store chain that was acquired by Weis Markets in August 2009
- Giant Open Air, a former grocery chain
