= New York Giants (disambiguation) =

The New York Giants are a professional American football team based in East Rutherford, New Jersey.

New York Giants may also refer to:

== Baseball ==
Major League Baseball

- San Francisco Giants, the current Major League Baseball team which originally played in New York City
  - New York Giants (baseball), the team from 1883 to 1957 before moving to San Francisco

Other baseball

- New York Giants (PL), a Players League team that played in New York City in 1890
- New York Lincoln Giants, an Eastern Colored League and American Negro league team that played in New York City from about 1911 to about 1930

== Other professional sport teams ==
American football

- New York Brickley Giants, National Football League franchise, 1921

Association football

- New York Giants (soccer) including
  - New York Giants (1894 soccer)
  - New York Soccer Club, also called the New York Giants from 1923 and 1930
  - New York Nationals (ASL), called the New York Giants between 1930 and 1932
