= Supergiant (disambiguation) =

A supergiant is a massive and luminous star, including:

- Blue supergiant, a hot supergiant star
- Yellow supergiant, a supergiant star with a temperature similar to the sun
- Red supergiant, a cool supergiant star

Supergiant may also refer to:

- Supergiant Games, a video game development company
- Super Giant, a Japanese superhero
- Alicella gigantea, the supergiant amphipod
- Rising Pune Supergiant, a former cricket team in the Indian Premier League
- Lucknow Super Giants, a cricket team in the Indian Premier League
- Manchester Super Giants, a cricket team based in Manchester, England; affiliated with the Lucknow Super Giants
- Type-cD galaxy, a supergiant elliptical galaxy
- Supergiant (comics), a fictional character in the Marvel Universe
