= Landers, California =

Unincorporated community in California, United States

Landers
- Unincorporated community
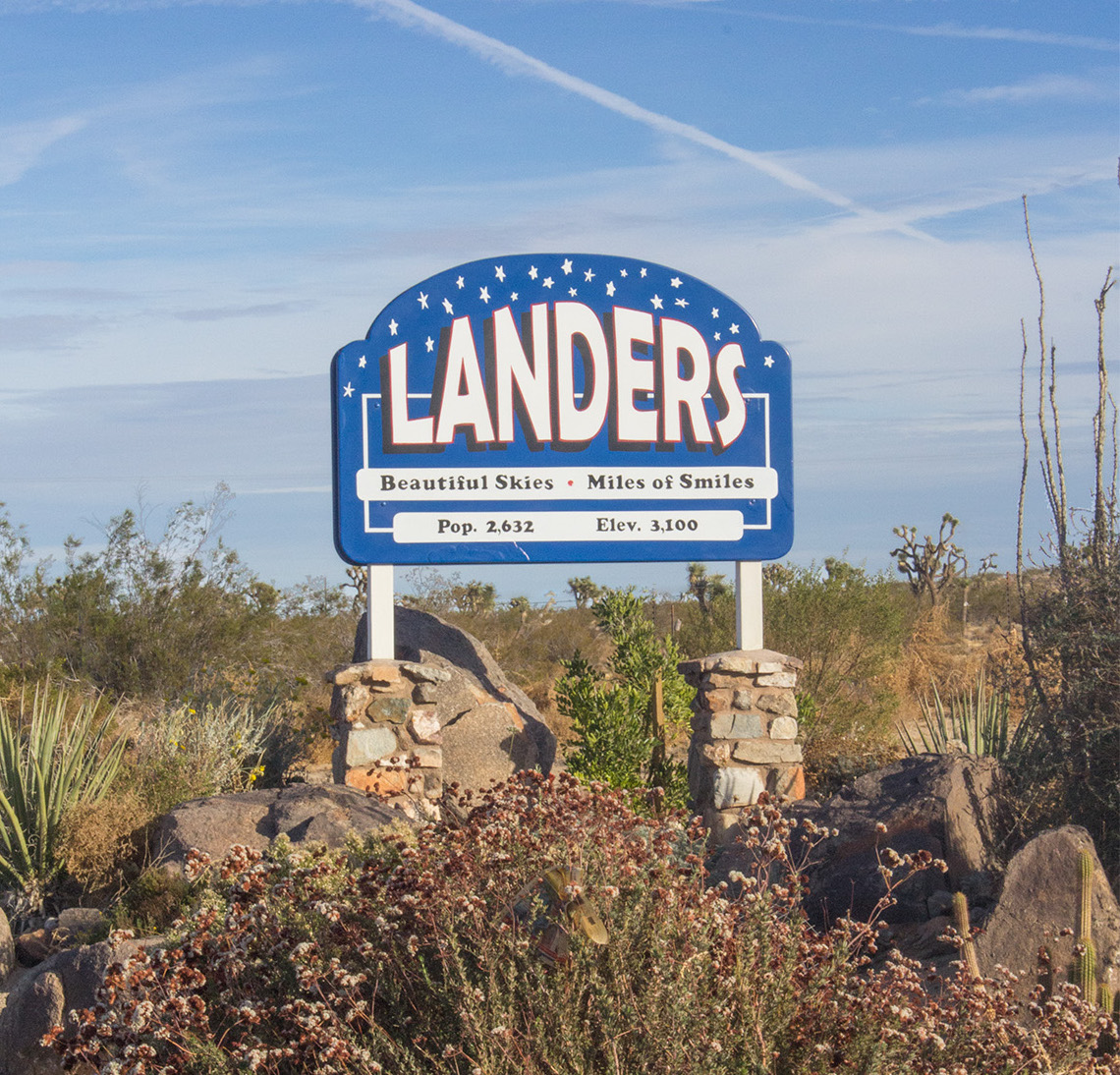
- The Landers sign outside the U.S. Post Office on Reche Road at Landers Lane

- Location within the state of California
- Coordinates: 34°15′58″N 116°23′32″W
- Country: United States
- State: California
- County: San Bernardino
- Elevation: 3,080 ft (940 m)

Population
  - Census Designated Place estimated 2017: 2,982
- Demonym: Landroid
- Time zone: UTC-8 (Pacific)
  - Summer (DST): UTC-7 (PDT)
- ZIP codes: 92285
- Area codes: 442/760
- FIPS code: 06-40158
- GNIS feature ID: 244564

Landers is an unincorporated community in the High Desert region of the Mojave Desert, in San Bernardino County, California. Landers' population, as of 2017, is 2,982 people. Its residents are sometimes referred to as "Landroids"—an allusion to the popular UFO culture in the area—and its official slogan is "Beautiful Skies, Miles of Smiles," adopted pursuant to a contest held by the Landers Association in early 2014. It was submitted by Ms. McCall's 3rd and 4th grade class at Landers Elementary School and was unveiled on June 10, 2014. However, for almost half a century, Landers has been known to its residents as "the land of 1000 vistas".

== History ==
The Landers area was originally settled in the early 20th century by prospectors who came to mine gold in Goat Mountain, starting with Charles Reche in 1914.

From the late 1940s through the 1970s, Landers was a popular gathering point for conventions of UFO enthusiasts, with the primary destinations of interest being the Integratron and nearby Giant Rock.

The area was the epicenter of the June 28, 1992 Landers earthquake, a magnitude 7.4 strike-slip earthquake that caused considerable structural damage to the surrounding area. A three-year-old boy was killed by falling bricks.

The Morongo Basin Historical Society is located in Landers; the original Post Office is now there.

== Geography ==
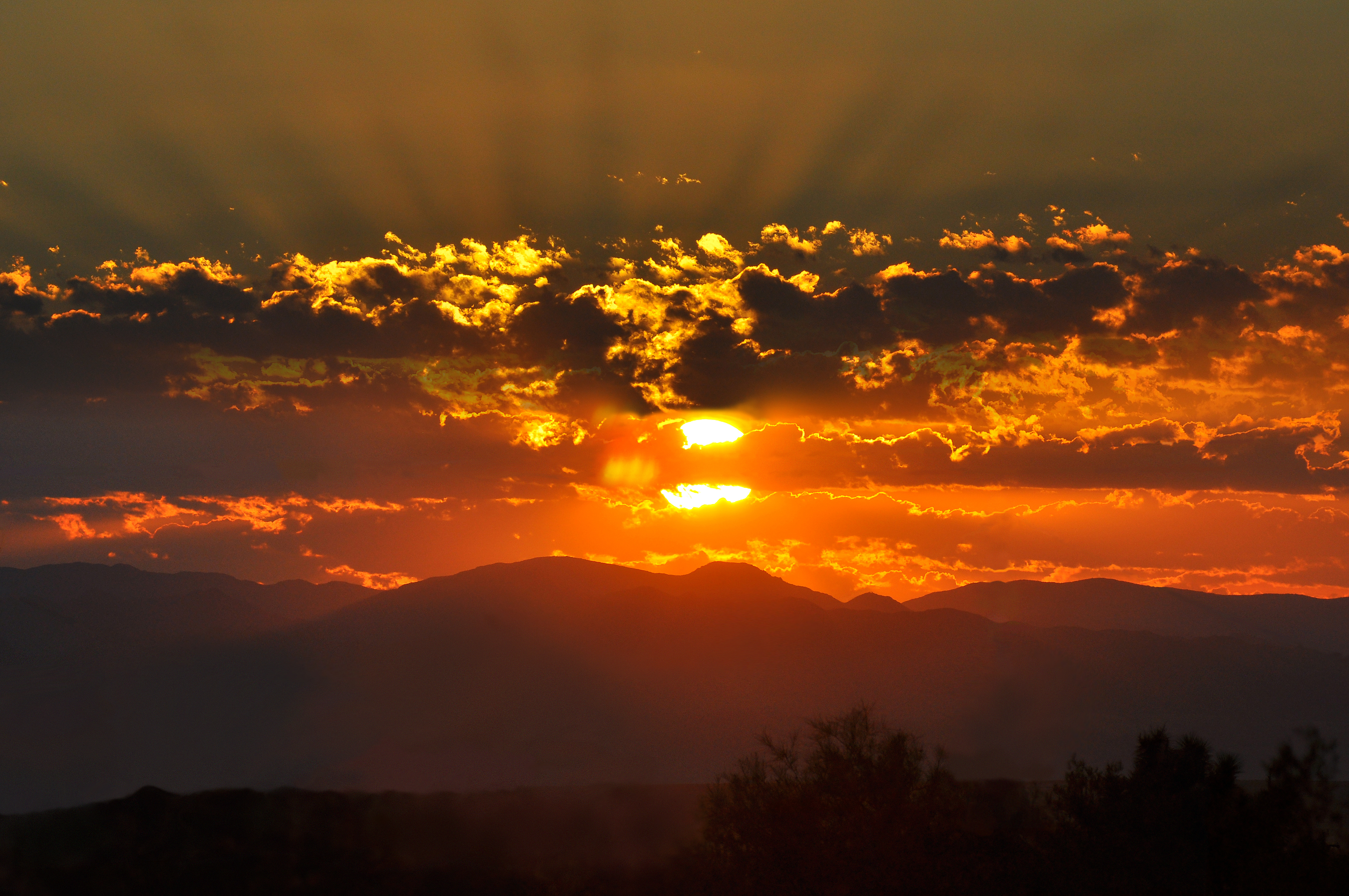
A typical sunrise in Landers, California looking east by southeast toward Joshua Tree, California

Landers lies in the Homestead Valley of the southeastern Mojave Desert. The nominal elevation of the community is 3,100 feet (940 m) above sea level; its highest point is the top of Goat Mountain that rises 625 feet above the surrounding area.

Landers is 14 miles (23 km) north of Yucca Valley, and borders the community of Flamingo Heights to its south. It's bordered by the city of Joshua Tree to its southeast and Johnson Valley, California is positioned north of Landers. Pioneertown is southwest of the community and California State Route 247, named "Old Woman Springs Road" in the area, passes through Landers from Yucca Valley en route north to Barstow.

The community is bounded on its north and east by the Marine Corps Air Ground Combat Center (MCAGCC), commonly known as 29 Palms.

=== Giant Rock ===
Adjacent to Landers on the north is Giant Rock, covering 5,800 square feet (540 m^{2}) and seven stories high. It is thought to be the largest free standing boulder in the world. A significant part of its southern side split off in February 2000 for unknown reasons. It was sacred to the Californian Indians in the region, where the north and south tribes met annually. The deteriorated remains of a packed sand air strip that was operational from 1947 to 1975 are still visible, as is a concrete pad that was the location of a cafe at the site, built and operated by George Van Tassel, who also built the Integratron.

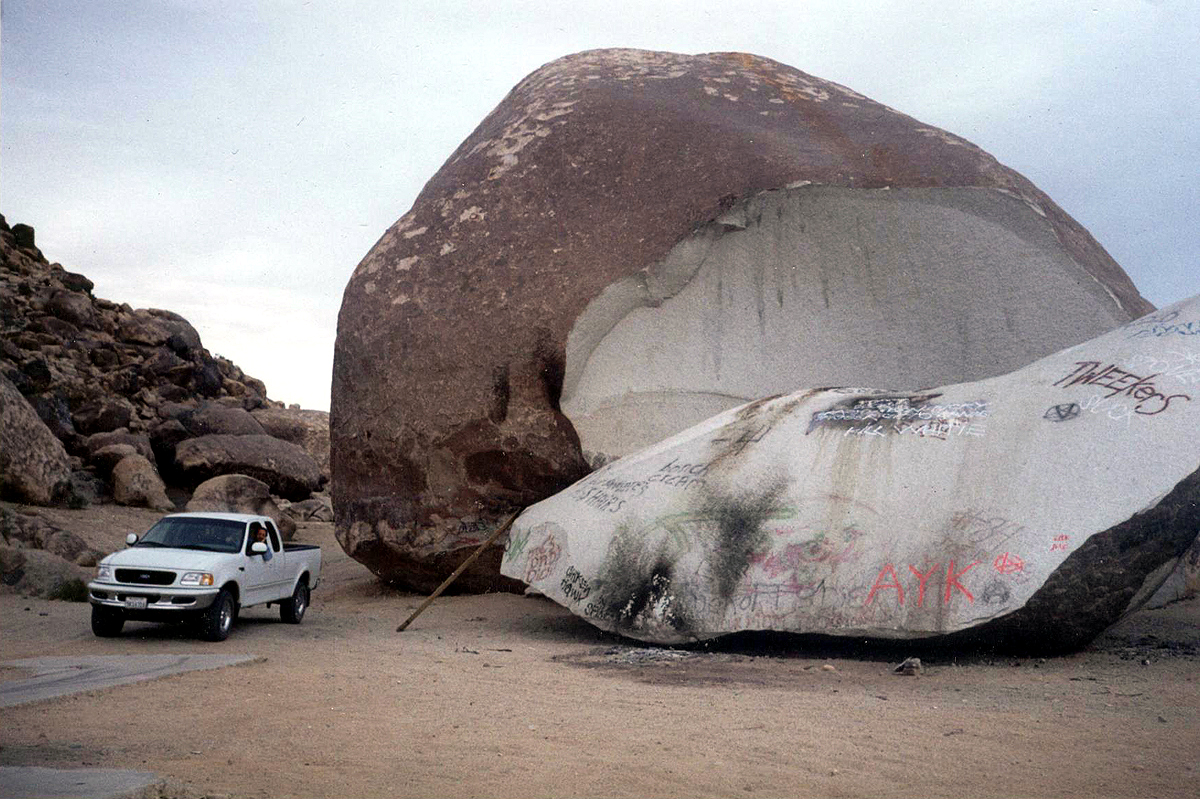
Giant Rock as compared to an average size pickup truck

== Politics ==
Like much of the High Desert region and the interior of California, as well as neighboring Yucca Valley and Twentynine Palms, Landers is far more conservative than the rest of the state. In the California State Legislature, Landers is in the 19th senatorial district, represented by Republican Rosilicie Ochoa Bogh, and in the 34th Assembly District, represented by Republican Tom Lackey.

In the United States House of Representatives, Landers is located in California's 23rd congressional district, represented by Republican Jay Obernolte.

== Economy ==
The U.S. Landers Post Office is located at Landers Lane and Reche Road, serving ZIP code 92285. A Loyal Order of Moose Lodge, community center (Belfield Hall), convenience store, elementary school, and recreational center with lighted ball field are also located in this rural desert community. The Landers Brew Co. occupies an old roadhouse originally built in 1948. There was once a Landers Airport, as well as one nearby at Giant Rock, both with short, packed dirt runways adequate for single engine aircraft. Neither facility is operational today.

=== Astronomical Facilities ===
There are two major amateur astronomical facilities in Landers: The Goat Mountain Astronomical Research Station (GMARS) and the Center for Solar System Studies (CS3). GMARS is owned by the Riverside Astronomical Society, and is one of the most ambitious installations of its kind in the world with over 23 observatories and a solar powered USGS seismic station. It also has over twenty telescope "pads" with electrical service that are used with field gear. For use by those pursuing scientific activities at GMARS, the facility has been assigned the international observatory code of G79. CS3 has nine robotic observatories and is primarily focused on asteroid research and photometric studies. The observatory codes assigned at CS3 include U80, U81 and U82.

=== Integratron ===
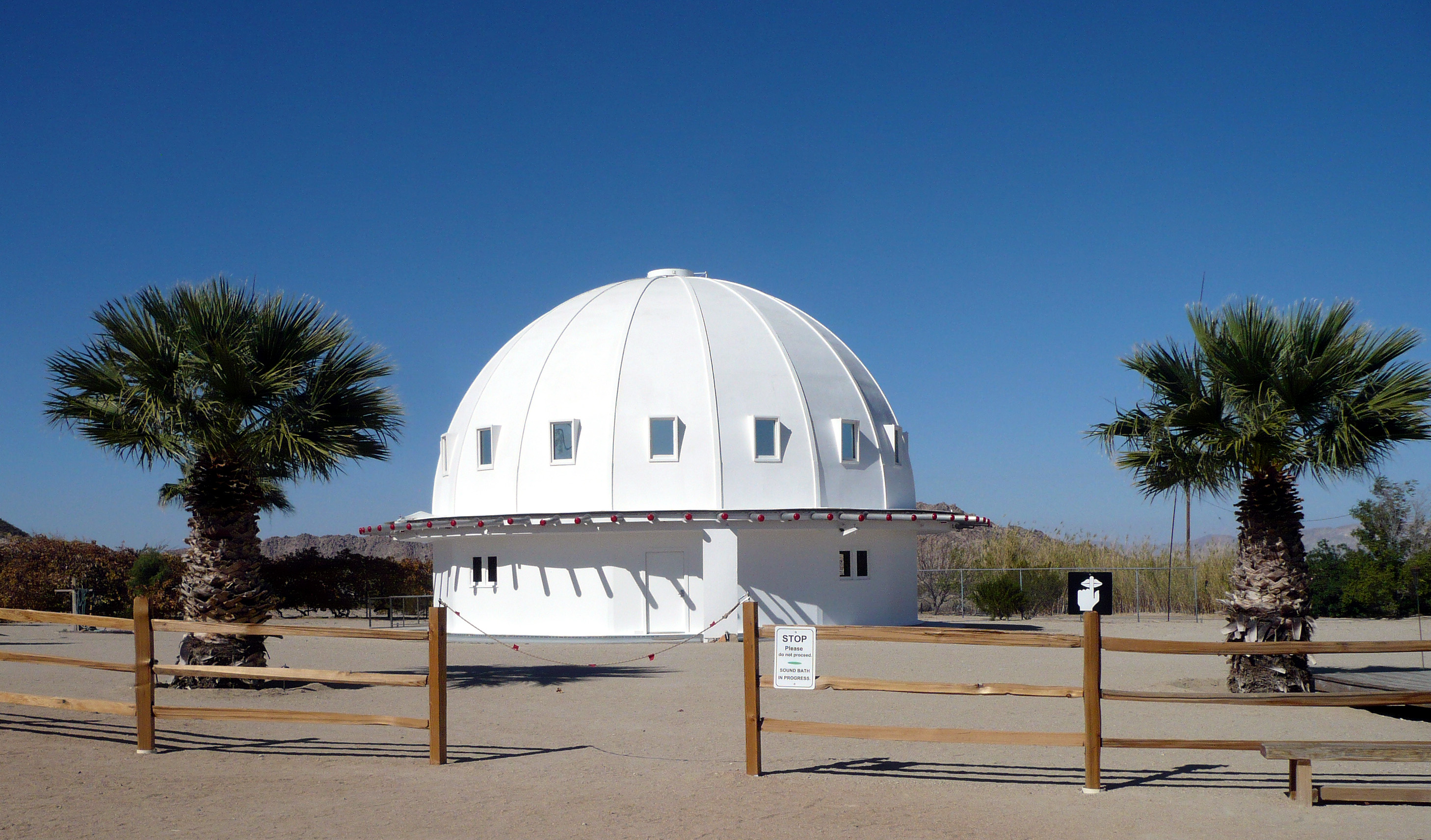
Integratron 2018

Author, inventor, and UFO advocate George Van Tassel (1910–1978) built the Integratron structure in the Giant Rock area from 1957 to 1977. The Integratron dome is built using a unique design of wood construction with 16 glued and laminated spines held together at its apex by one ton of concrete. It is 38 feet (12 m) high and 50 feet (15 m) in diameter.

The Integratron and Giant Rock are the two Landers sites of most interest to UFO enthusiasts. Renowned food and travel personality Anthony Bourdain did a segment in 2011 on Van Tassel and the Integratron as part of his No Reservations television series (s07e13 – see here). Van Tassel, the Integratron and Giant Rock received serious treatment in 2018 by filmmaker Jonathan Berman in his documentary, Calling All Earthlings. The Smithsonian magazine, Air & Space, has an informative article on the documentary here. The compound is now open to the public as a study, performance, and retreat center for organized programs regarding neuroacoustics, music, meditation, energy healing, architecture, alternative health, science, and spirituality.

== Gallery ==
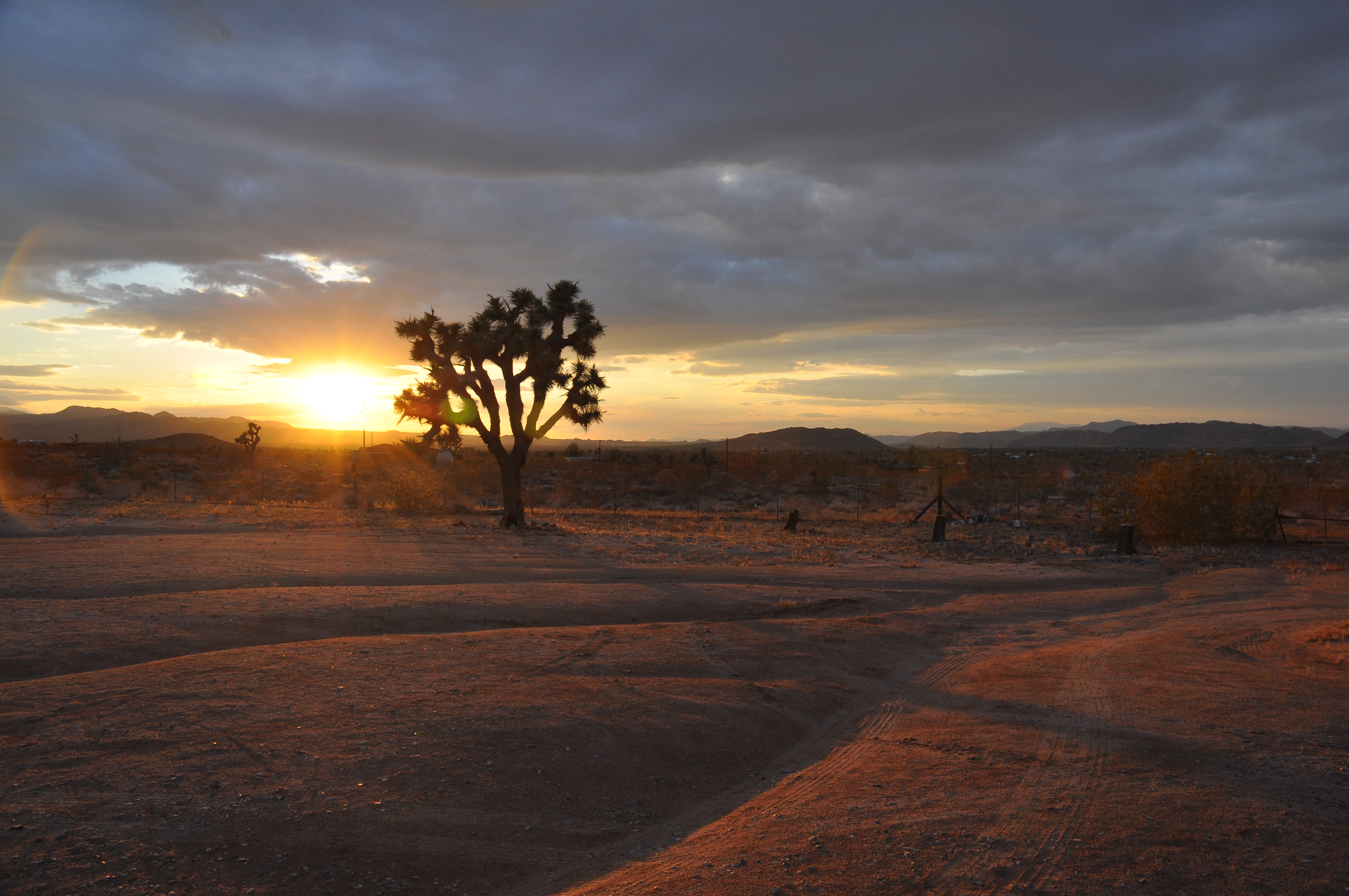
The Landers desert landscape is home to the protected Joshua Tree

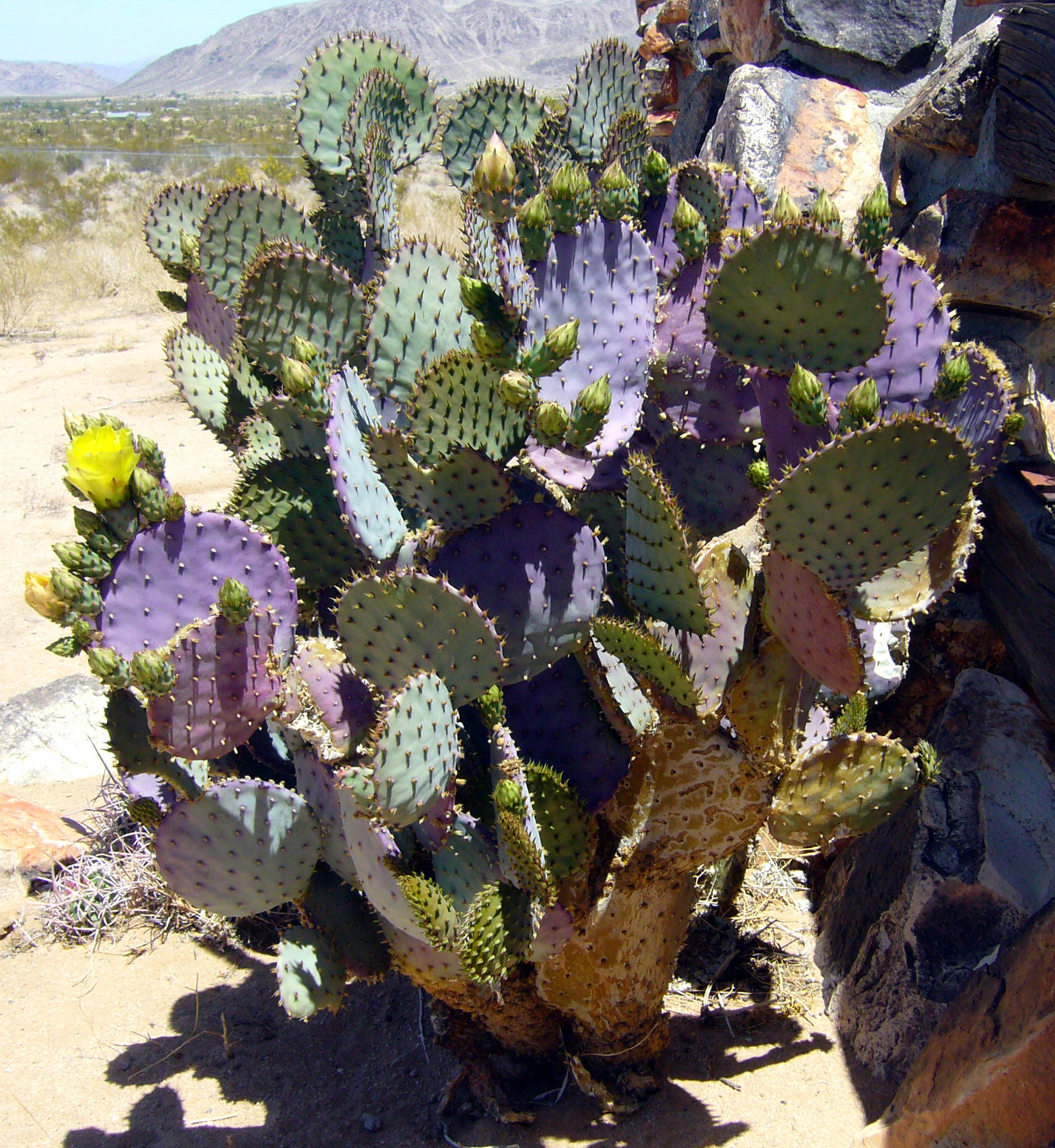
Opuntia basilaris, or Beavertail Cactus, is common in Landers

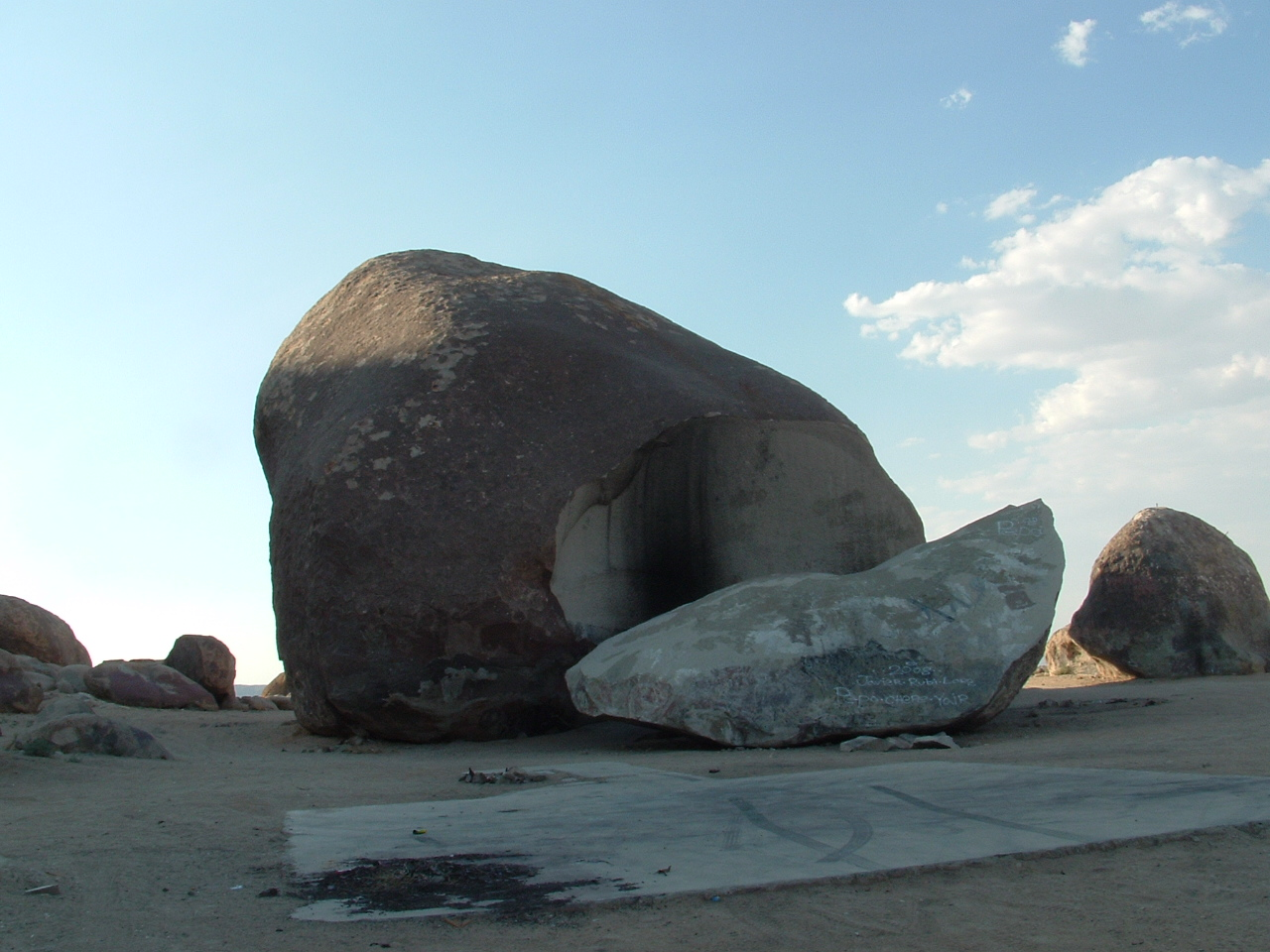
Giant Rock, adjacent to Landers, California

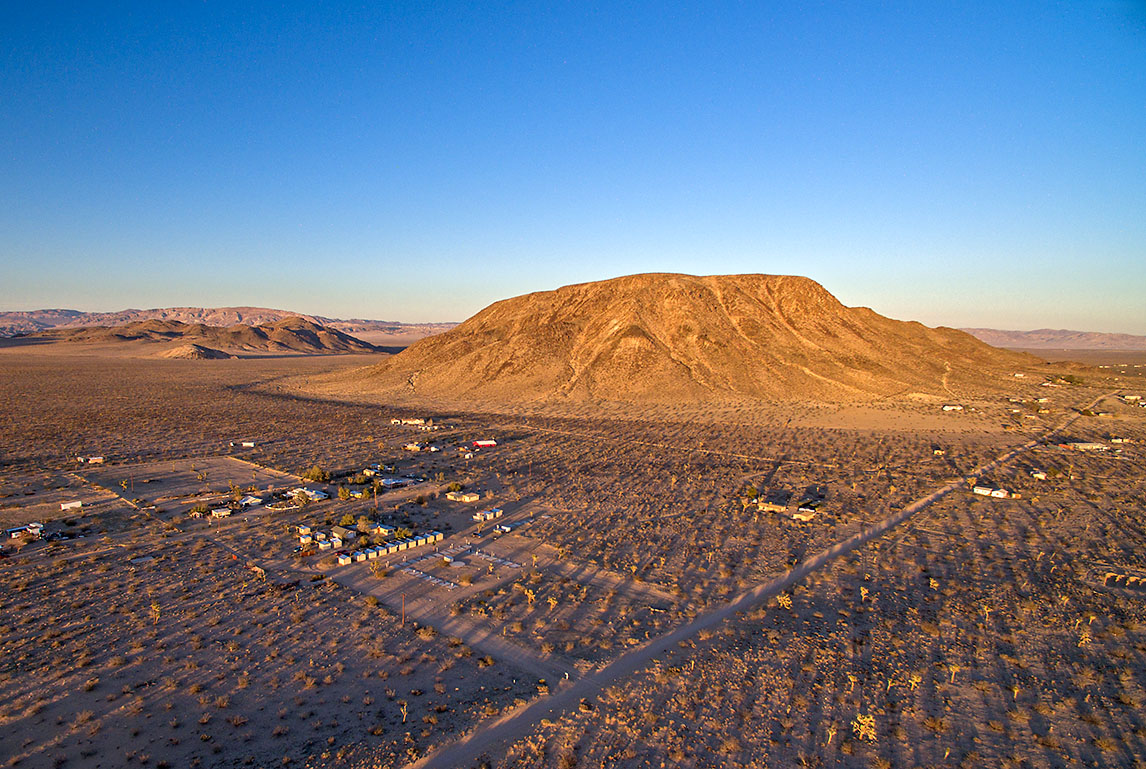
View to the NE of Goat Mountain in Landers, California, with the Goat Mountain Astronomical Research Station in foreground

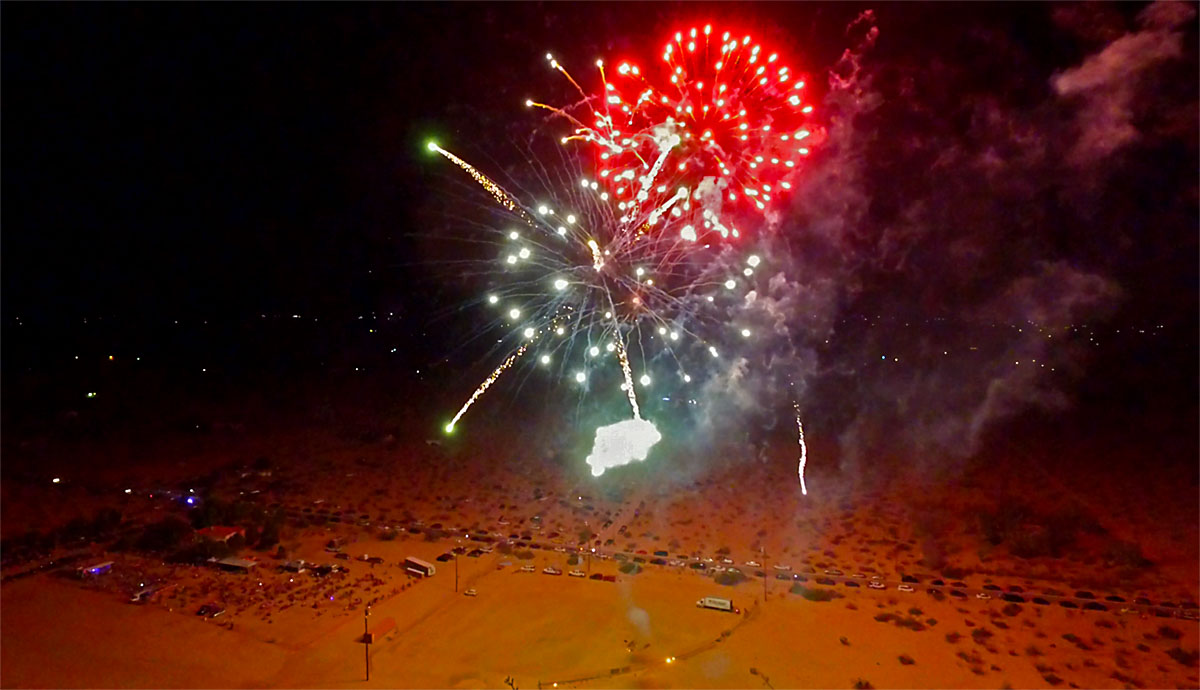
There is an annual fireworks event in Landers, California, held at its recreational park and ball field

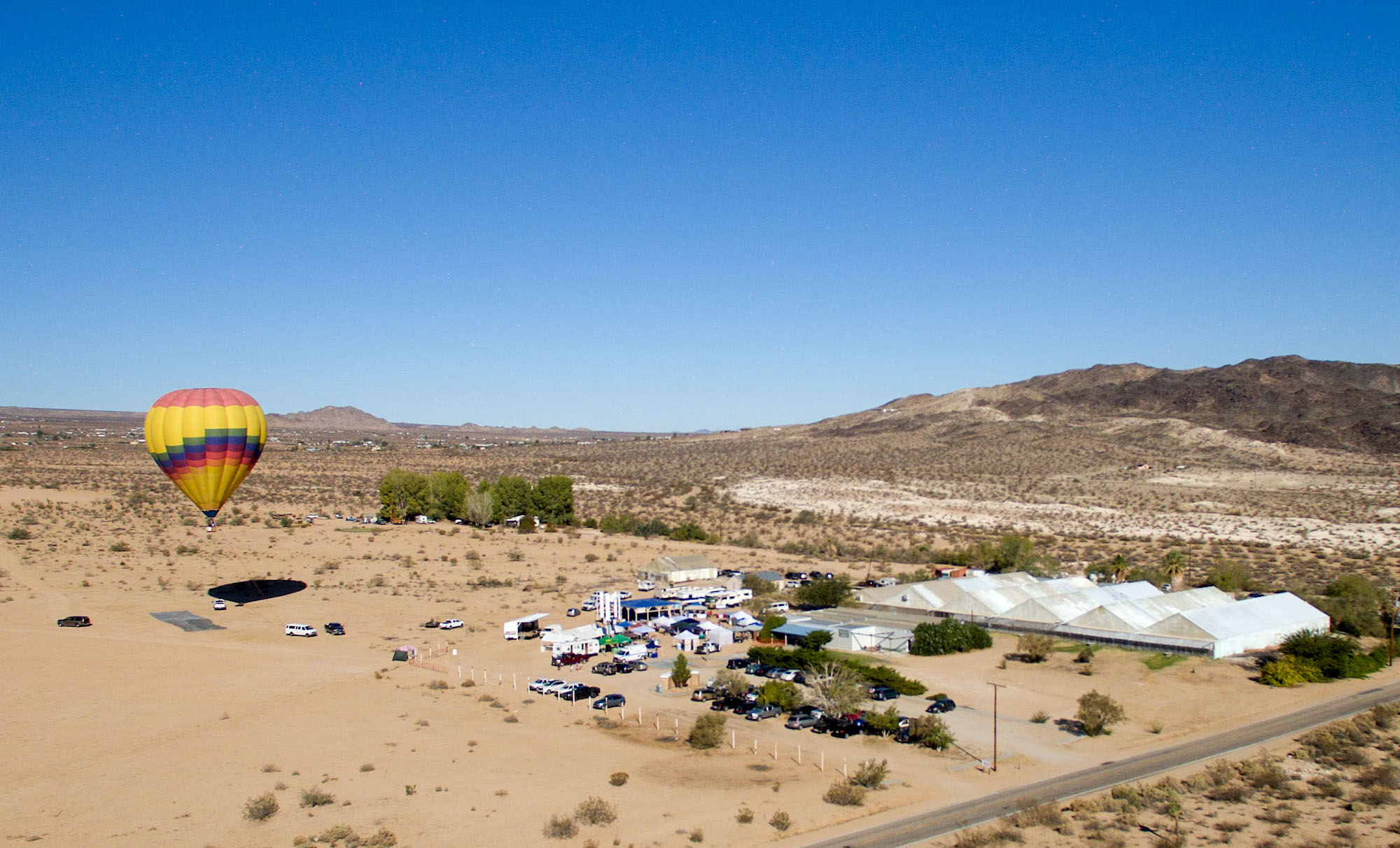
In 2016, the Orchid Festival at Gubler Orchids featured hot air balloon rides

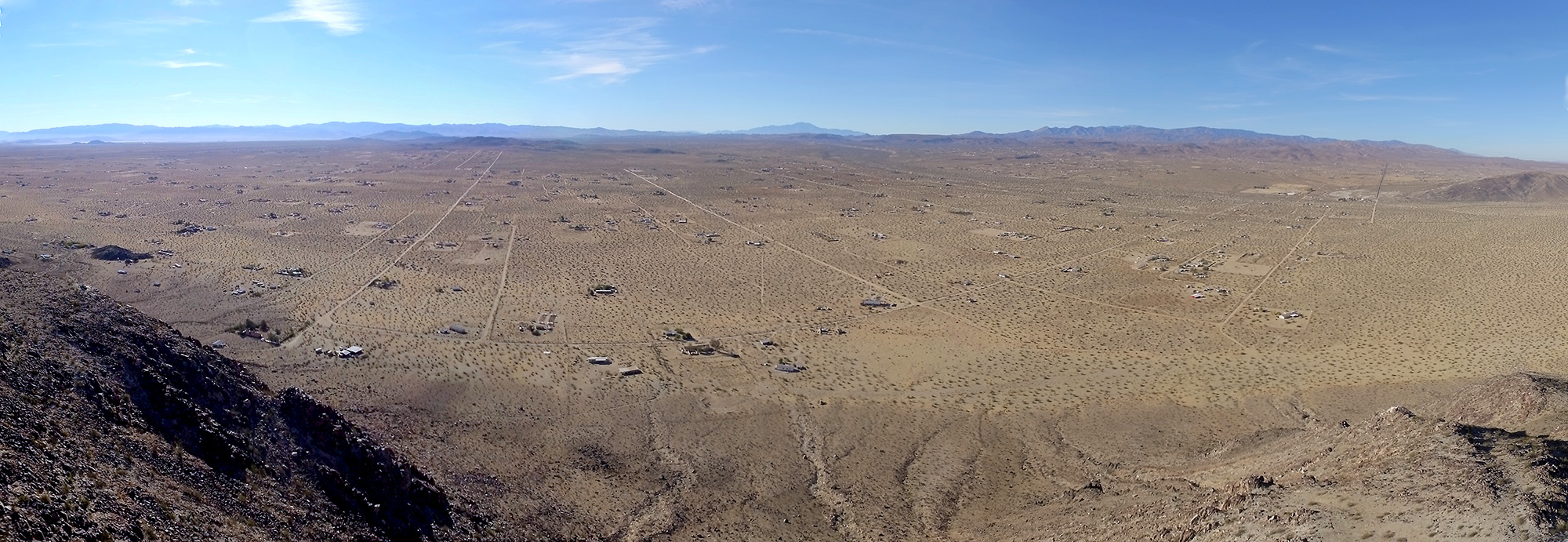
Aerial view of the community of Landers taken from over its highest point Goat Mountain

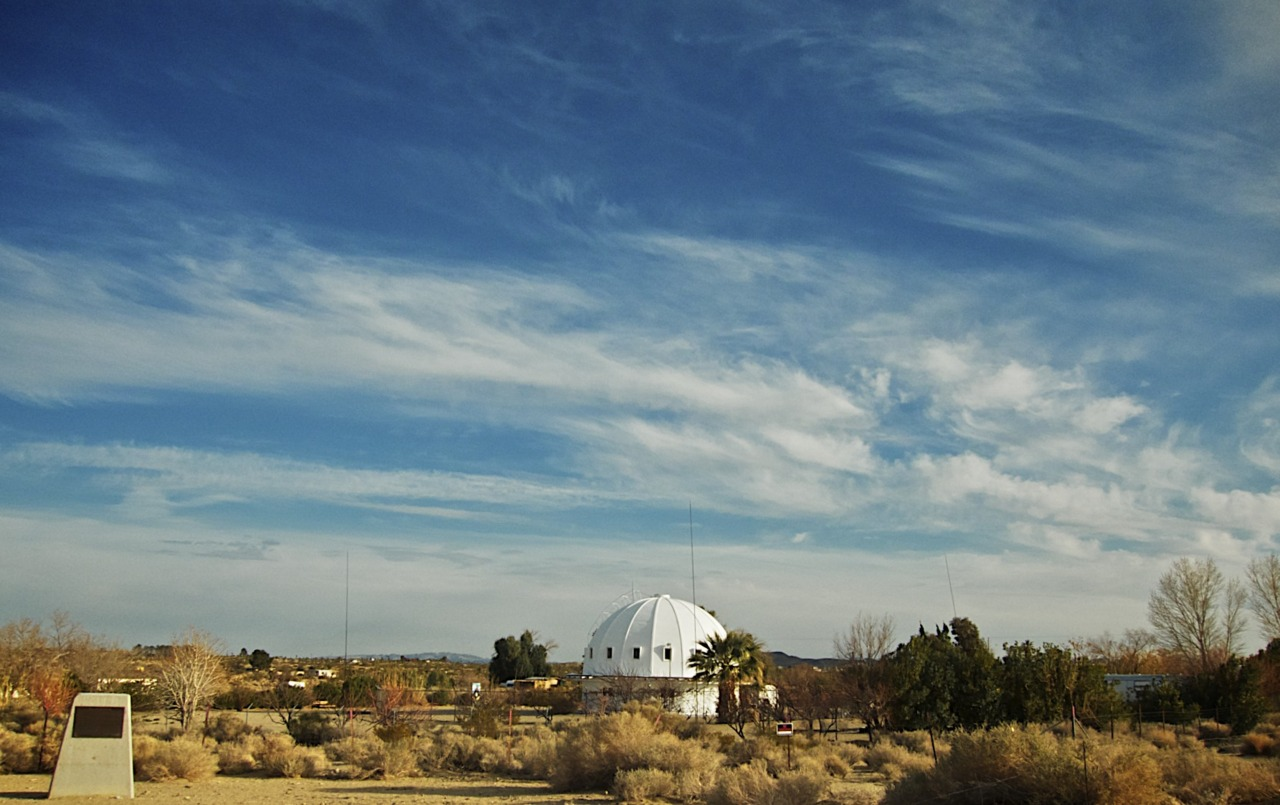
View of the Integratron and the surrounding landscape, winter 2018

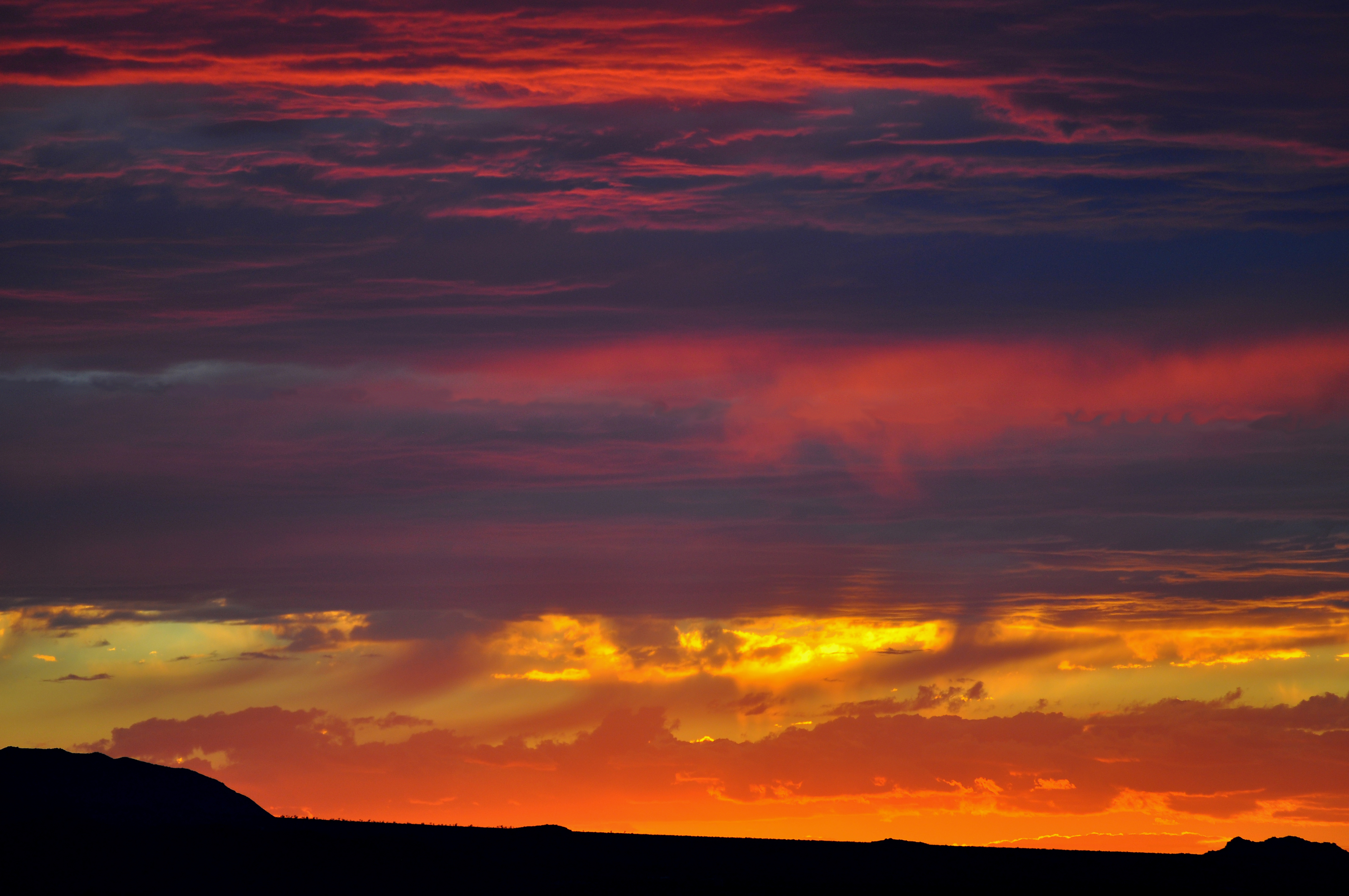
Midsummer twilight over the Mojave desert in Landers

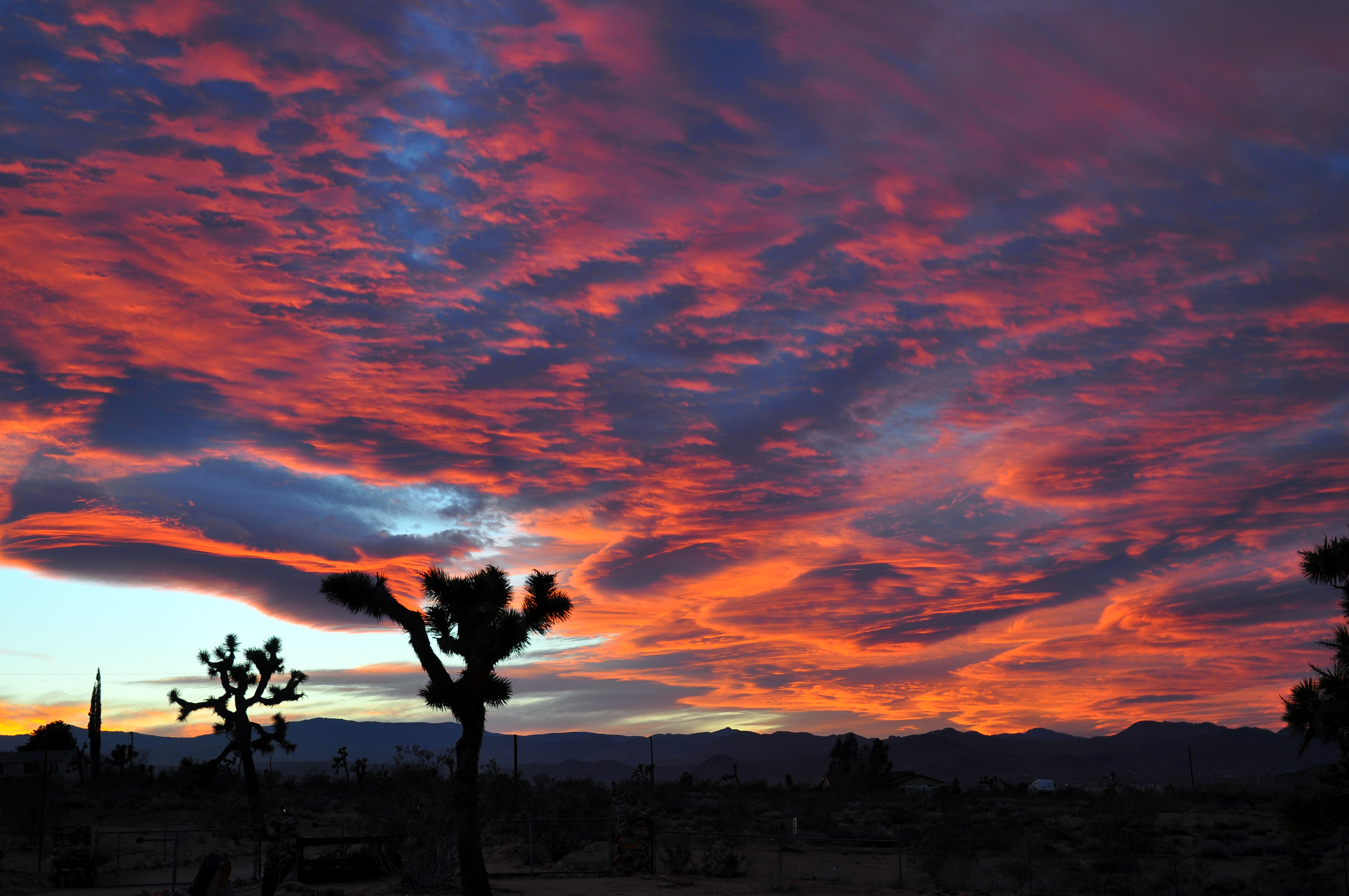
Red sunset twilight, Landers, California USA

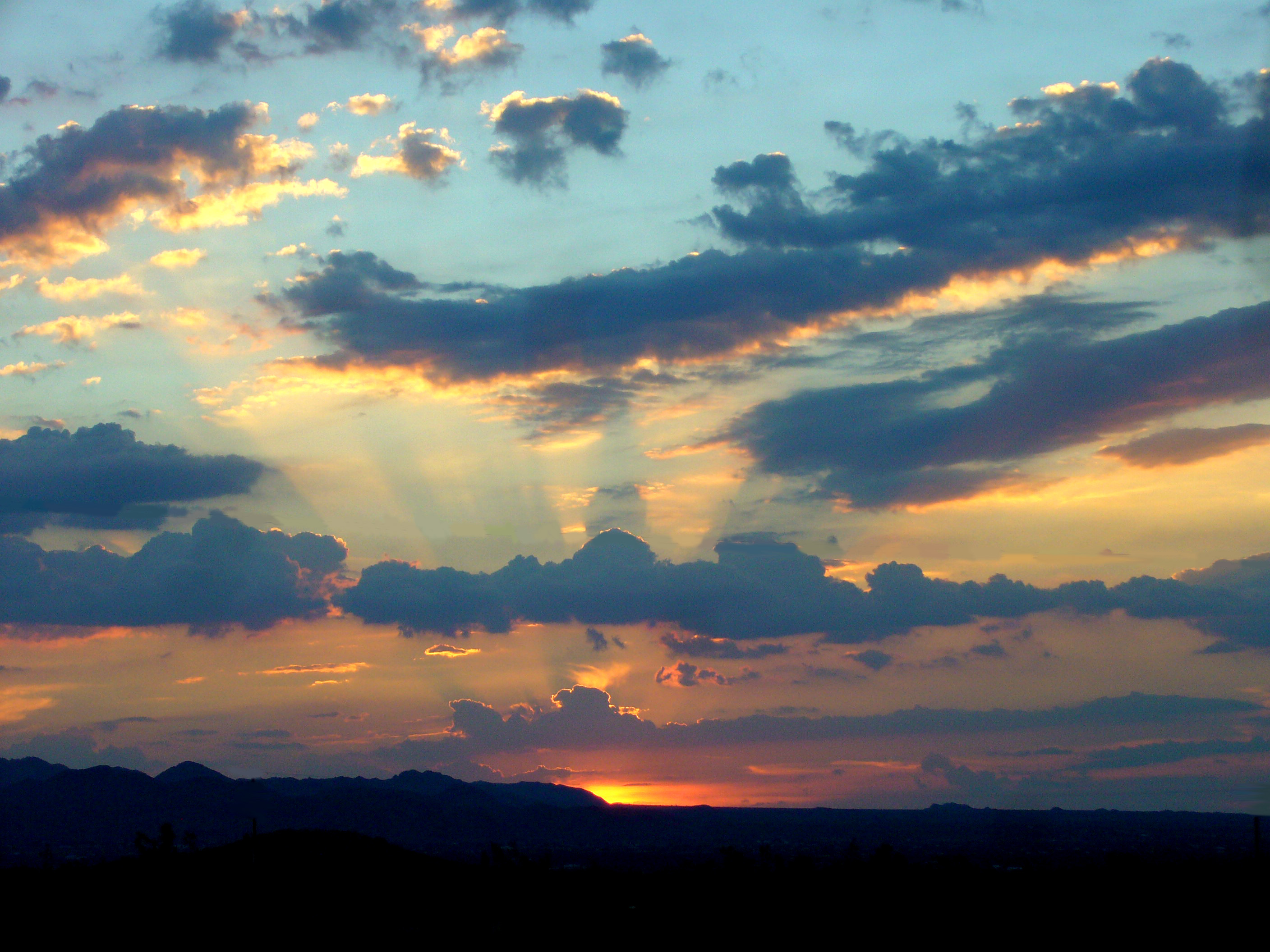
Burning Yellow Sunset, Landers, California USA

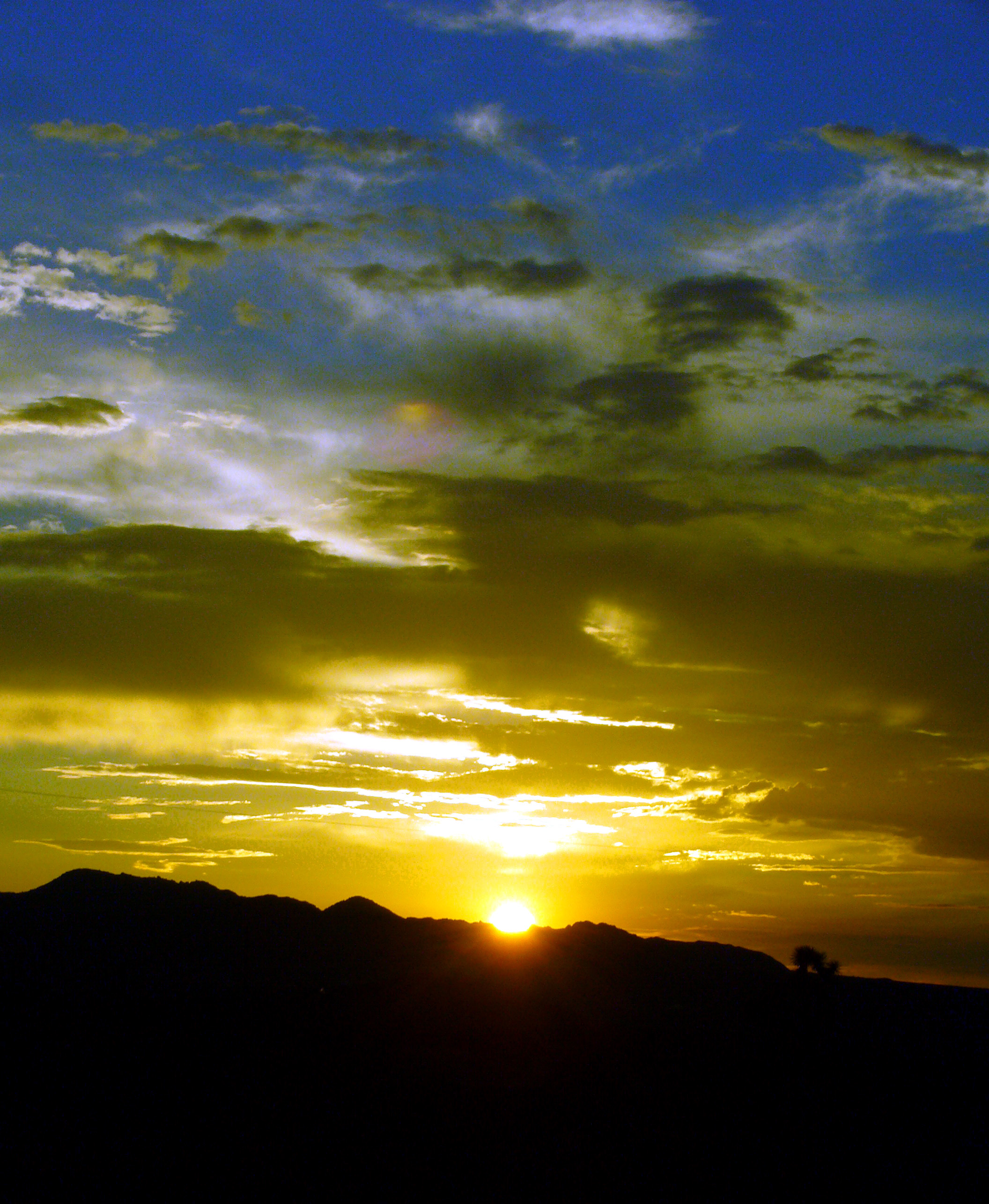
Mustard Blue Sunset, Landers, California USA

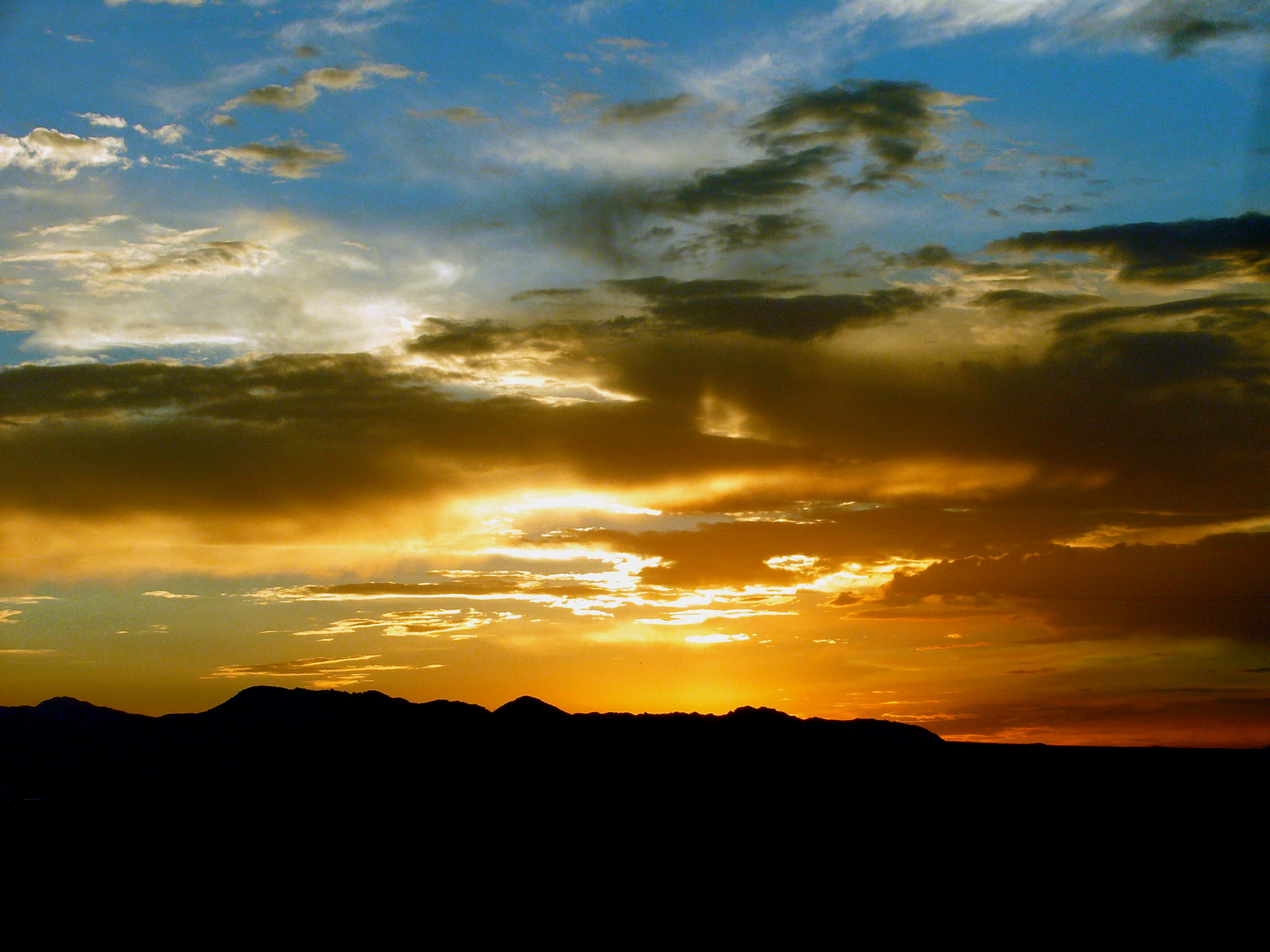
Burnt Horizon, Landers, California

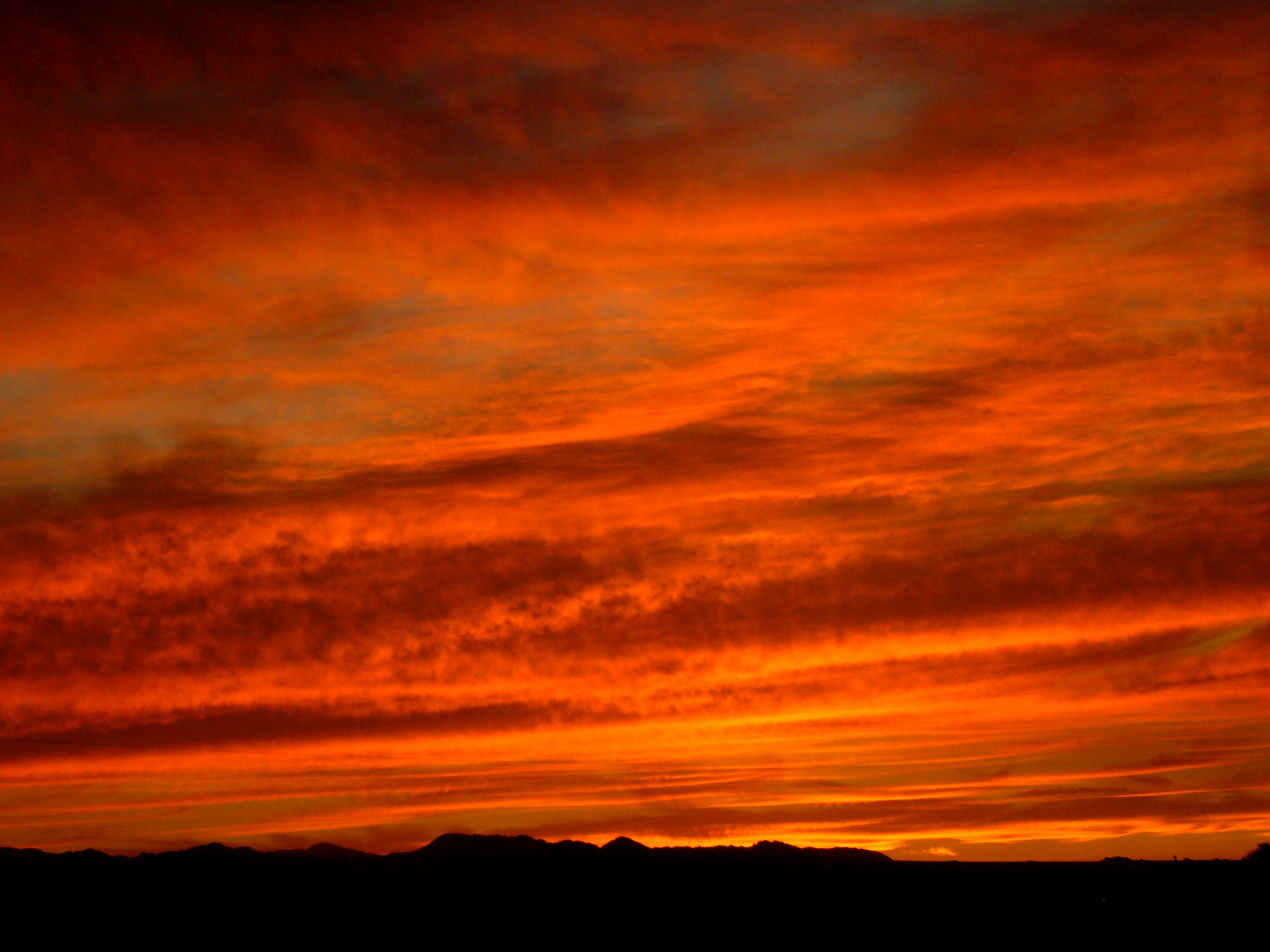
Fire Twilight, Landers, California

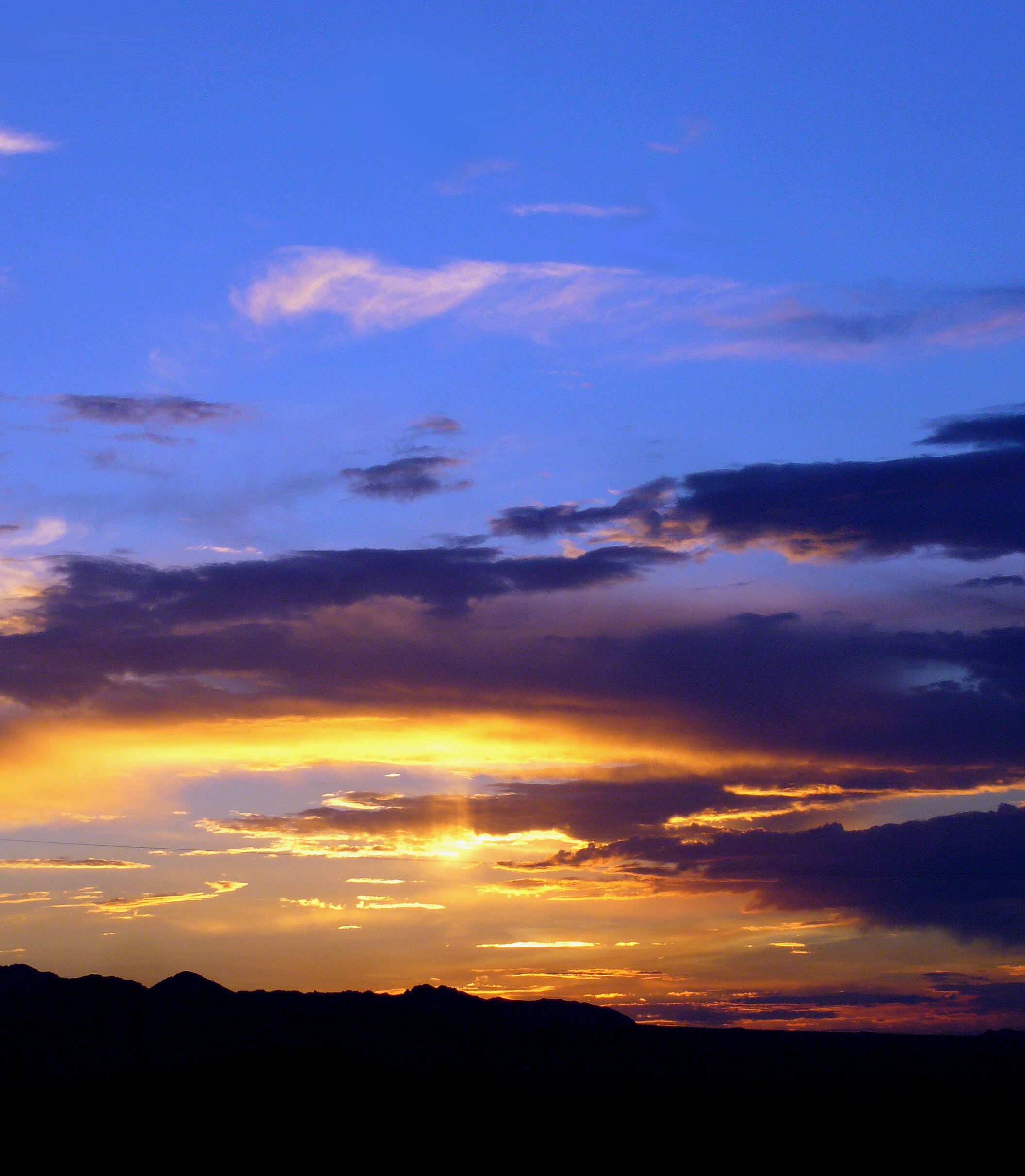
Royal Blue Sky over Horizon, Landers, California

== See also ==
- Joshua Tree National Park
- Lucerne Valley
- Homestead Valley
