= Giant Rock =

Boulder in the Mojave Desert, California, USA

Coordinates: 34.332813°N 116.388723°W

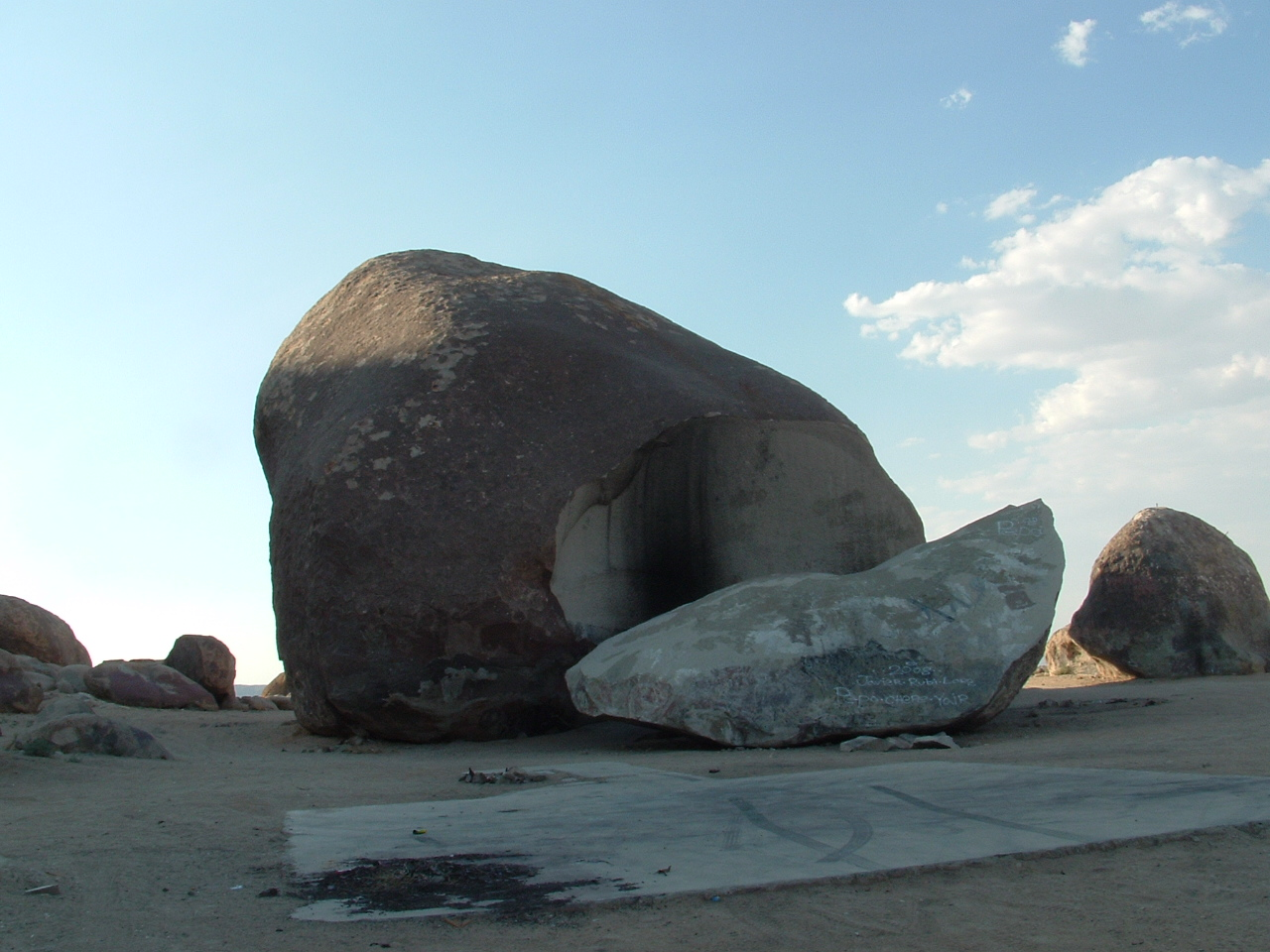
The Giant Rock

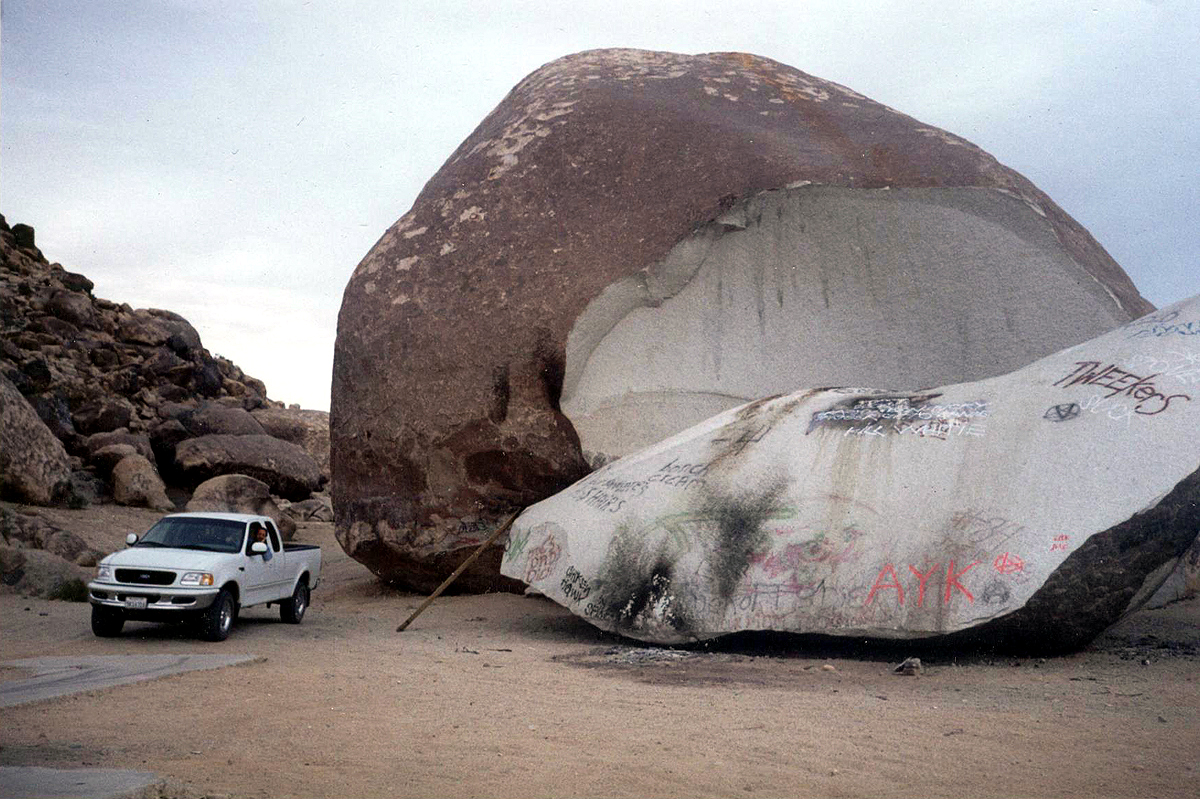
Giant Rock as compared to an average-sized pickup truck

Giant Rock is a large freestanding boulder in the Mojave Desert near Landers, California, and the Marine Corps Air Ground Combat Center Twentynine Palms located at DD coordinates 34.33287, -116.38875 covering 5,800 square feet (540 m^{2}) of ground. Giant Rock is the largest freestanding boulder in North America. It is also purported to be the largest free standing boulder in the world, but this assessment has been recently questioned by the description of an apparently larger boulder in the Corani district in Peru.

== History ==
In the 1930s, Frank Critzer moved to Giant Rock. Inspired by desert tortoises that dig holes in which to cool themselves, Critzer dug out a home on the north side of the rock using dynamite. He engineered a rainwater collection system and a tunnel for ventilation. The underground home was reportedly never hotter than 80 °F (27 °C) and never cooler than 55 °F (13 °C). Critzer built an airstrip on the nearby ancient lakebed, which averaged a plane per day by 1941. Critzer perished in a self-detonated dynamite explosion in his underground rooms on July 24, 1942, while being investigated by local police.

In the 1950s, Giant Rock was a gathering point for UFO believers. It is located on land which was at that time leased by George Van Tassel, a friend of Critzer's, a purported flying-saucer contactee and organizer of UFO conventions. In 1947, Van Tassel, a former aircraft inspector, leased the property from the Bureau of Land Management and left Los Angeles and moved to Giant Rock with his wife and three children. During the early 1950s, Van Tassel began hosting Friday night "meditation" sessions in Critzer’s former underground home, where he claimed to receive telepathic communications from "compassionate Venusian extraterrestrials." Van Tassel also built the nearby Integratron and a cafe, store, gas station, and the Giant Rock Airport, which he operated from 1947 to 1975.

The Giant Rock Airport was certified by the Federal Aviation Administration for emergency use by commercial airliners. In the early 1960s it experienced traffic of about one flight per day. Between November 1961 and October 1962, it served as the launch site for helium-filled balloons used by R. F. Miles, Jr. to measure the density of neutrons in the Earth's atmosphere at altitudes of 8,000–115,000 feet (2,400–35,100 m).

In early 2000, Giant Rock fractured in two, revealing an interior of white granite. The exterior surface of the rock has been since partially covered in graffiti.

== In popular culture ==
Fictionalized versions of Giant Rock and Van Tassel figure heavily in the plot of the novel Gods Without Men by Hari Kunzru.

Australian artist Tina Havelock Stevens won the Blake Prize with a video work depicting her drumming at the site.

Live at Giant Rock, a live album by Yawning Man, was recorded with the band performing near the boulder.

Giant Rock plays a major role in the science fiction book Stolen Skies by Tim Powers.

== See also ==
- List of individual rocks
