= Chicago Union Giants =

Chicago Union Giants may refer to:

- Chicago Unions, a Negro league baseball team that played from 1887 to 1900
- Leland Giants, a Negro league baseball team originally known as the Chicago Union Giants from 1901 to 1904
- Peters' Union Giants, a Negro league baseball team also known as the Chicago Union Giants
