= Géant Uruguay =

Géant Uruguay is a hypermarkets chain in Uruguay, Géant franchise (Groupe Casino), belonging to the Éxito Group. It has two branches, located in Ciudad de la Costa and in Montevideo.

== History ==
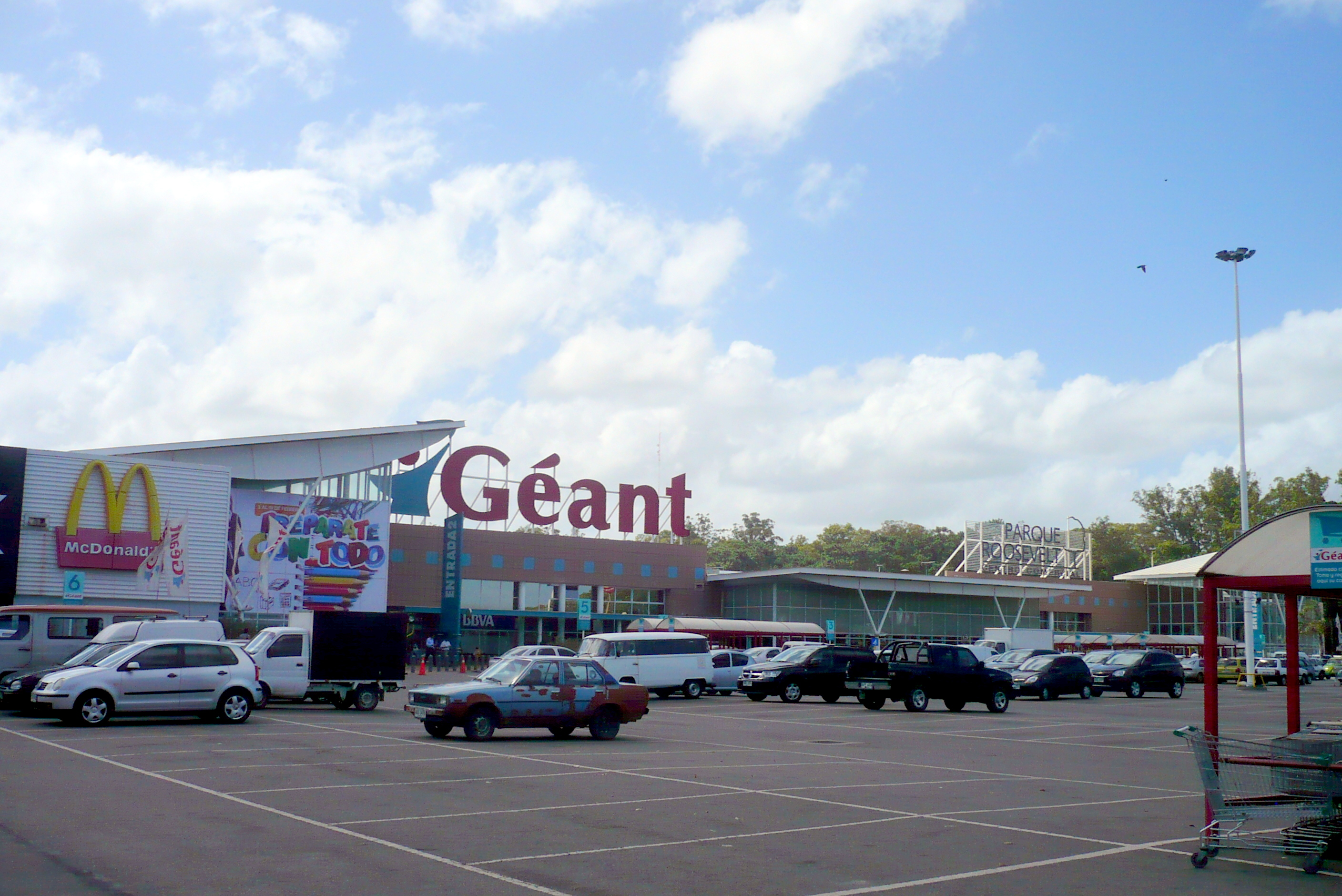
Géant in Ciudad de la Costa, Uruguay.

On September 29, 1999, Géant opened its first branch in Ciudad de la Costa. In 2013, a second Géant branch was opened in the Nuevocentro Shopping, in Montevideo. In February 2025, the opening of a third branch in Maldonado was announced for 2026.
