= Valuas (folklore) =

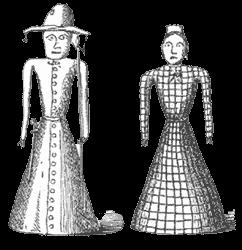
Valuas and his wife in an illustration from 1754

Bructer Valuas (in short:Valuas) is the name of a legendary chief of the Bructeri, exclusively known from a Venlo folklore tale. The name might be a corruption of Goliath.

== Background story ==
According to the legend, the city of Venlo were to be founded in the year 96 A.D. by this chief. After being defeated by the neighbouring tribe of the Chamavi in the Teutoburg Forest, Valuas and his trustees fled in southwest direction to a fertile region near the river Meuse, as noted by Publius Cornelius Tacitus. There the remaining Bructeri built a settlement he then called Venloë, which, according to the legend, means height in the swamp.

After their death, in honor of the chief and his wife Guntrud large wooden statues were made, which were placed on a nearby hill. Their followers, the people of Venlo, let a fire burn for a long time inside these statues. To this use the hill owes its present name ‘’Lichtenberg’’.

== Castle ==
According to Lambert Keuller, a local historician, Valuas founded a castle in 96 A.D., which he called Vrijburg.

The castle were to be built at the present square called ‘’Oude Markt’’, on the southeast corner. This area also would have been the main location of the settlement in that time. Later, in the early Middle Ages, the castle disappeared. Although the exact moment of disappearance has not been noted, Keuller means that this happened in the 9th century, when the Vikings raided the northwest of Europe.

== Giant puppets ==
In 1750, the people of Venlo made giant puppets which they carried around in religious processions. These giant puppets are still taken through the streets of Venlo with festivities. Although the name of Valuas has already been recorded in 1708, the puppets go through the streets as from 1750 after a publication on their use. Before that they were carried in ecclesiastical processions as the biblical Goliath and his wife for centuries. The Bishop of Roermond said that despised puppets of Goliath and his wife had to disappear. The people of Venlo did not want that and devised the story of the Bructeri chief. So, Venlo does not owe its name to Valuas, but rather Valuas owes his name to Venlo.
