= Southern Television broadcast interruption =

TV audio transmission hoax in southern England (1977)

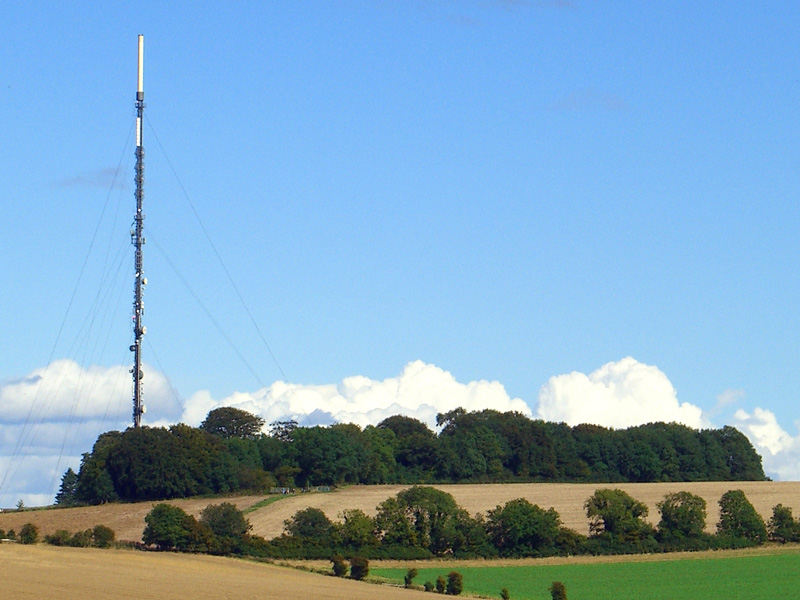
- The Hannington transmitter mast in 2006, from where the broadcast signal was hijacked
- Date: 26 November 1977; 48 years ago
- Location: Southern Television

The Southern Television broadcast interruption was a broadcast signal intrusion, or pirate broadcast, that occurred on 26 November 1977 in parts of southern England in the United Kingdom. The audio of a Southern Television broadcast was replaced by a voice claiming to represent the "Ashtar Galactic Command", delivering a message instructing humanity to abandon its weapons and live in peace with one another so it could participate in a "future awakening" and "achieve a higher state of evolution". After five and a half minutes, the broadcast returned to its scheduled programme, the 1947 Looney Tunes cartoon Goofy Gophers.

Subsequent investigations showed that the Hannington transmitter of the Independent Broadcasting Authority had rebroadcast the signal from a small but nearby unauthorised transmitter, instead of the intended source at Rowridge transmitting station. The event prompted hundreds of telephone calls from concerned members of the public, and was widely reported in British and American newspapers. These reports are sometimes contradictory, including differing accounts of the name used by the speaker, the organisation they claimed to represent, and the wording of the message.

== Event ==
At 5:10 p.m. GMT on Saturday 26 November 1977, ITN's Ivor Mills presented a news summary on developments in the Rhodesian Bush War in present-day Zimbabwe. For viewers who received their TV sound signal from the Hannington television transmitter, the audio of the broadcast was interrupted and replaced by a deep buzz, followed by a distorted male voice delivering a message for almost four minutes. The speaker claimed to be Vrillon, a representative of the Ashtar Galactic Command, and claimed that the earth had only a short time to disarm and learn to live in peace. The name "Ashtar" and the idea of an "Ashtar Command" had been associated with extraterrestrial communication since the 1950s, when UFO contactee George Van Tassel claimed to have received a message from Ashtar, and others subsequently claimed to be able to channel the Ashtar Command.

The interruption ceased shortly after the statement had been delivered, with transmissions returning to normal shortly after the beginning of the 1947 Merrie Melodies cartoon The Goofy Gophers. After the cartoon had ended, Southern Television, which had been unaware of the interruption at the time and only learned of it when viewers began to call in, apologised for the interference in sound experienced by some viewers. ITN also reported on the incident in its own late-evening Saturday bulletin.

According to the Independent Broadcasting Authority (IBA), the interruption was the first of this kind in the country.

== Transcript ==
A complete transcript of the message reads:

This is the voice of Vrillon, representative of the Ashtar Galactic Command, speaking to you. For many years, you have seen us as lights in the skies. We speak to you now in peace and wisdom as we have done to your brothers and sisters all over this, your planet Earth. We come to warn you of the destiny of your race and your world so that you may communicate to your fellow beings the course you must take to avoid the disaster which threatens your world, and the beings on our worlds around you. This is an order that you may share in the great awakening, as the planet passes into a new Age of Aquarius. The new Age can be a time of great peace and evolution for your race, but only if your rulers are made aware of the evil forces that can overshadow their judgments. Be still now and listen, or your chance may not come again. All your weapons of evil must be removed. The time for conflict is now past and the race of which you are a part may proceed to the higher stages of its evolution if you show yourselves worthy to do this. You have but a short time to learn to live together in peace and goodwill. Small groups all over the planet are learning this and exist to pass on the light of the dawning new Age to you all. You are free to accept or reject their teachings, but only those who learn to live in peace will pass into the higher realms of spiritual evolution. Hear now the voice of Vrillon, the representative of the Ashtar Galactic Command, speaking to you. Be aware also that there are many false prophets and guides at present operating on your world. They will suck your energy from you, the energy you call "money", and will put it to evil ends, giving you worthless dross in return. Your inner divine self will protect you from this. You must learn to be sensitive to the voice within that can tell you what is truth, and what is confusion, chaos and untruth. Learn to listen to the voice of truth which is within you and you will lead yourselves onto the path of evolution. This is our message to our dear friends: We have watched you growing for many years as you too have watched our lights in your skies. You know now that we are here, and that there are more beings on and around your Earth than your scientists admit. We are deeply concerned about you and your path towards the light and will do all we can to help you. Have no fears, seek only to know yourselves, and live in harmony with the ways of your planet Earth. We of the Ashtar Galactic Command thank you for your attention. We are now leaving the planes of your existence. May you be blessed by the supreme love and truth of the cosmos.

== Investigation and explanation ==
An investigation into the incident was launched by police, the Post Office, which had been granted statutory powers in regulating the use of radio frequencies by the 1949 Wireless Telegraphy Act, and the Independent Broadcasting Authority, which owned the transmitter.

At that time, the Hannington television transmitter was unusual in being one of the few main transmitters that rebroadcast an off-air signal received from another transmitter, the Independent Broadcasting Authority's Rowridge transmitter on the Isle of Wight, rather than being fed directly by a landline. As a consequence, it was open to this kind of signal intrusion, as even a relatively low-powered transmission very close to the rebroadcast receiver could overwhelm its reception of the intended signal, resulting in the unauthorised transmission being amplified and rebroadcast across a far wider area. The IBA stated that to carry out such a hoax would take "a considerable amount of technical know-how". A spokesman for Southern Television confirmed the explanation: "A hoaxer jammed our transmitter in the wilds of North Hampshire by taking another transmitter very close to it."

Had the perpetrator(s) been caught, they could have been fined up to £200 under the Wireless Telegraphy Act.

On 30 November, Southern Television stated to newspapers that it had discovered how the interruption was made and closed the 'loophole' that had been used to do so. By December a spokesperson for the Home Office stated that the investigation was complete despite the perpetrator not being caught. A further statement from a spokesperson for Southern Television explained that there was little hope that they would be able to catch the perpetrator unless they did it again. An engineer from the Independent Broadcasting Authority said it would be possible to protect the tower against future incidents. A Spokesperson for the IBA, however, said that they had no plans to make any changes as a result of the interruption.

== Public and media response ==
The incident caused some local alarm; Southern Television received hundreds of phone calls from worried viewers after the intrusion. The Winchester police received more than 50 calls from people dialling the UK emergency telephone number (999) to report the incident.

Reports of the event carried worldwide, with numerous American newspapers picking up the story from United Press International and the Associated Press. Reports of the speaker's name varied in many sources, with most British newspapers at the time reporting the speaker as "Gillon" or "Gillon of the Ashdown Galactic Command", or as "Asteron".

The wording of the message as reported in newspapers also caused confusion, with some reporting that the voice had threatened an imminent invasion of Earth unless Earth put down its weapons, and others reporting (following the United Press International report) that the speaker warned that Earth would have to "leave the galaxy" if it did not learn to live in peace. Speaking on British commercial radio on 6 December 1977, Sir John Whitmore questioned such reporting of the incident, suggesting that claims that the message was threatening and frightening were projections by the newspapers, rather than present in the original message itself.

The Aetherius Society, a UFO religious group which 'investigated' the sighting agreed that it was a hoax. Nevertheless, the broadcast became a footnote in ufology as some chose to accept the broadcast at face value. By as early as 1985, the story had entered urban folklore, with suggestions there had never been any explanation of the broadcast.

A 1999 episode of children's television series It's a Mystery, coincidentally produced by one of Southern's successors, Meridian Broadcasting, re-enacted the incident with faux news reports and viewers watching the incident play out at home.

== See also ==
- Captain Midnight broadcast signal intrusion
- Max Headroom signal hijacking
