= Ashtar Sheran =

Alleged extraterrestrial being

Ashtar
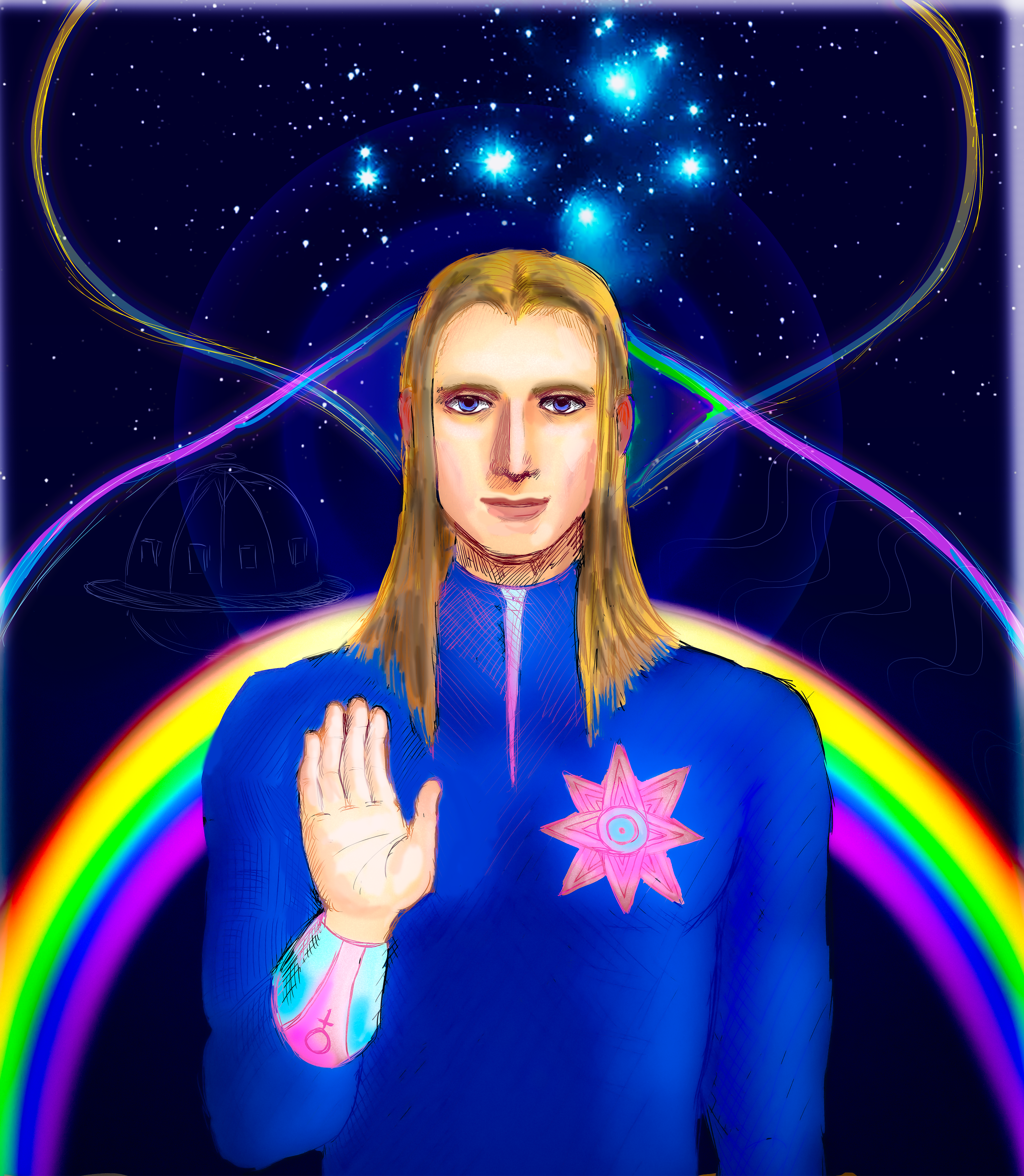
- Human drawing of Ashtar Sheran

Creature information
- Other name(s): Ashtar Sheran, Captain Ashtar, Commander Ashtar, Lord Ashtar
- Folklore: Ufology

Origin
- Country: United States

Ashtar (sometimes called Ashtar Sheran) is the name given to an extraterrestrial being or group of beings that a number of people claim to have channeled.

UFO contactee George Van Tassel was the first to identify Ashtar and claim to receive his messages in 1952, which are collected in his first book.

After the introduction of Ashtar by Van Tassel, other mediums began to claim contact. At one point, dozens of people were claiming contact with Ashtar and presenting conflicting messages. The most widely publicized of these messages were met with failure when they predicted civilizations flourishing on the other planets and an imminent landing of space ships on Earth.

Due to his common depiction as a humanoid with blond hair and European features, Ashtar may be considered a Nordic alien.

The Ashtar movement is studied by academics as a prominent form of UFO religion.

An example of a religion incorporating Ashtar is the Czech Universe People who venerate Ashtar alongside Jesus and Krishna among others; one of their site domains is "ashtar-sheran".

== History ==
=== Background ===
With the advent of UFO religions, "Ascended Masters" from the esoteric teachings have been described as reappearing in space suits. The space concept was not entirely new however, as the more arcane teachings of Theosophy contained references to extraterrestrial masters. The concept of the Ascended Master is particularly clear in the Ashtar teachings. The very word "ashtar" appears in Helena Blavatsky's The Secret Doctrine (1888). However, this reference is to the Sanskrit term ashtar-vidya, meaning the technology of advanced warfare of the type mentioned in the Mahabharata.

Brenda Denzler observes that "in the long run, probably the most important person for the propagation and perpetuation of the contactee movement was George Van Tassel". In 1947 Van Tassel moved to Giant Rock, near Landers in the Mojave Desert, California, where he established a large UFO Center. This became the most successful and well-known UFO meeting center of the time.

As one of the founding "fathers" of the modern religious ufologies, Van Tassel also created arguably the most prominent UFO group established in the United States in the late 1940s and early 1950s, although not as influential or well-known today. This was the "Ministry of Universal Wisdom" begun in 1953, which evolved out of two previous groups he had organized at Giant Rock in the late 1940s. The organization investigated and encouraged the healing arts, but its prime focus was to collect and analyze UFO phenomena and interview contactees. Due to radio and television interest, Van Tassel became the most well-known promoter of contactee experiences and something of a celebrity in the 1950s.

=== Purported contact with Van Tassel ===
In 1952, Van Tassel claimed to receive messages via telepathic communication from an extraterrestrial and interdimensional being named "Ashtar". This source became the "first metaphysical superstar of the flying saucer age". Van Tassel also interpreted the Christian Bible in terms of extraterrestrial intervention in the evolution of the human race, and claimed that Jesus was a being from space. The Ministry of Universal Wisdom taught that all humans have the power to tap into the "Universal Mind of God", which facilitates evolutionary progress such as that exemplified by Jesus and Ashtar. Van Tassel also claimed that by accessing the Universal Mind he could receive messages not only from Ashtar but from humans who had died. Van Tassel even reported having a physical encounter with an alien. At two a.m. on August 24, 1953, as he recalled, Van Tassel was awakened by a being from Venus named Solgonda. The alien wore a one-piece gray bodysuit, spoke impeccable English, and otherwise resembled your average human man—if your average man is 700, looks no more than 28, and sports a killer tan. According to Van Tassel, Solgonda beamed him aboard a spacecraft and declared that the greatest problem restricting mankind was the propensity for early death: just as we acquire the wisdom to do something meaningful, it’s all over, finito. He bequeathed to Van Tassel a formula—F = 1/T, or frequency equals one over time—to enable the construction of an antigravity time machine that would allow age reversal, antigravity, and time travel. For the next quarter century, reportedly with financial backing from Hughes, Van Tassel worked on constructing the Integratron, so called because of his belief that it could integrate the healing power of electrostatic energy into our cells, thus inhibiting aging. When he died in 1978, the contraption was still unfinished. The integratron was said to work by combining Lakhovsky’s electromagnetic principles with theories from Nikola Tesla and Moses’ Tabernacle. Lakhovsky theorized that human cells are electrical conductors that receive and transmit impulses, and that disease or aging occurs when these cell vibrations slow down. Van Tassel designed the Integratron as a massive electrostatic generator and rejuvenation machine meant to bombard the body with electromagnetic fields to restore cellular health.

Van Tassel's early purported messages from Ashtar contained a great deal of apocalyptic material, which focused on concerns regarding the development of the soon-to-be-tested hydrogen bomb. It was claimed that on July 18, 1952, Ashtar entered the Solar System as Commander in Chief of the Ashtar Galactic Command to warn humanity of the dangers of detonating the H-bomb, including the destruction of the planet. The messages stated the space command was determined that humans would not destroy the Earth through the wrong use of nuclear power and that the Command was helping the human race. Van Tassel also claimed that Ashtar had provided specific messages that he was expected to pass on to the U.S. federal government regarding the potential negative impacts of the proposed upcoming bomb tests. After the actual explosion of the H-bomb by the U.S. and Russian governments, the channeling claimed that the space forces had assisted the planet to survive the bomb tests.

Although his purported method of communication with extraterrestrial intelligences resembled what is commonly referred to as "channeling", Van Tassel claimed to have established a new form of telepathic communication with these "sources", utilizing a method which included both natural human abilities and the use of an allegedly advanced form of alien technology, rather than the more traditionally religious, non-technological, spiritual medium-based approach taken by many other early channelers of the era. Van Tassel maintained that the method he utilized was not a paranormal or metaphysical activity, but required being "in resonance" with the messages being sent. It was an example of the application of an allegedly advanced extraterrestrial science, that anyone could implement with the proper training in meditation techniques.

=== Giant Rock Space Conventions ===
Van Tassel held weekly channeling sessions at Giant Rock at which people could "ask questions" and "channel answers" from extraterrestrials. According to Jerome Clark, these gatherings coalesced the scattered contactee subculture into a recognizable movement in January 1952. This led to the annual Giant Rock Spacecraft Convention organized by Van Tassel, which began in the spring of 1953 and continued for at least another 24 years. It marked Van Tassel's most important role in UFO history. In 1959, up to 11,000 people attended these conventions and heard channeled messages claiming to come from space. Most of the well-known UFO contactees attended these conventions as speakers and channelers. J. Gordon Melton states that almost all of the 1950s contactees became involved in the two ecumenical structures founded by either Van Tassel or Gabriel Green. Most of the early messages Van Tassel claimed to have received from Ashtar were first presented to the public at these events.

=== Ashtar Command ===
As the weekly channeling sessions at Giant Rock continued through the early 1950s, the concept of an "Ashtar Command" was appropriated for use by a number of prominent early contactees and channelers, based on the figure of Ashtar, originally promoted by Van Tassel.

Robert Short (AKA Bill Rose), editor of the 1950s UFO magazine Interplanetary News Digest, was a member of Van Tassel's group. He began to popularize the messages, but as Van Tassel did not agree that other Ashtar messages were authentic, Short broke away and began his own group called "Ashtar Command".

By the mid-1950s, the concept of Ashtar and a galactic law enforcement agency preparing an imminent rescue of humanity had become well-established, and included various well-known, esoteric channelers of the era. For instance, Elouise Moeller predicted that a space fleet would arrive in the near future; and Adelaide J. Brown claimed that flourishing civilizations existed on the other planets in the solar system.

However, as time and scientific knowledge progressed, the public failure of these predictions had an enormous negative impact on the expansion of the Ashtar Command movement due to the lack of a central authority that could undertake damage control. Although Robert Short had spent a lot of time promoting the Ashtar message, he was neither the leader nor the only interpreter, as by this time dozens of Ashtar channelers were presenting conflicting messages.

=== Development into spiritual religion (1990s onward) ===
The initial account of the Ashtar message as channeled through Van Tassel was not a spiritual message as such but "an early contact account between extraterrestrials and humankind". It focused on intervention in human scientific development, and was described as technological communication from a real space being on an urgent interstellar undertaking. However, throughout the 1950s and 1960s, as many individuals in the spiritualist movement began to claim contact with Ashtar, the space being began to play more of an Ascended Master role in the narratives.

The Ashtar Command evolved into a movement that had a central authority for several decades up to the mid-1990s, and has been described by Robert P. Flaherty as "the common property of a diffuse New Age Spiritualist milieu". During this time the teachings claiming to be channeled from Ashtar varied immensely. In the late 1980s, self-purported channeler Thelma Terrell, writing under the pen name Tuella founded Guardian Action International. Through into the 1990s, she published several books under this pseudonym and publisher, claiming to have been approached by Ashtar and asserting her works as channeled text.

Andreas Grunschloss, who refers to the Ashtar Command as a worldwide network of several loosely organized groups, describes much of the Ashtar channeling as akin to cargo cults, due to the blending of spiritual ascension with new alien technologies and ecologically harmless energies. Grunschloss maintains that most of the Ashtar millenarian concepts involve a transformation of human beings, via these technologies, who will then return to the planet Earth to enjoy a golden millennium. Later, with the failure of these prophecies, teachings were modified to include less material and more spiritual emphasis.

=== 1970s broadcasts ===
In 1971, a British radio talk show devoted to UFOs received a strange call-in claiming to originate from outer space, which some of the guests believed to be genuine. This turned out to be the prelude for the 1977 Southern Television broadcast interruption, when a voice calling itself "Vrillon" of the Ashtar Galactic Command temporarily took over a television transmitter in southern England.

=== 1986 prediction of 1994 apocalypse ===
Yvonne Cole, who claimed to be channeling Ashtar messages from 1986, predicted the destruction of all Earth civilizations and the arrival on the planet of various alien cultures in 1994. Cole claimed that governments were working with extraterrestrials to prepare for contact. According to Cole, the landing would be broadcast through the global media and include a message from the Ashtar Command. Due to "sensitization", most of humanity would accept the UFOs as part of humanity's continuing evolution, while Ashtar followers would be needed as advisors, ambassadors and peacekeepers between the alien races and humankind. This would lead to a radical transformation of the world as humanity was initiated into a higher level of existence. These prophecies furthered the continued fracturing and disappointment within the movement when they failed to occur. Despite these failures, during the 1980s a number of individuals began to claim contact with the Ashtar Command through channeling, and various small groups were formed to receive and disseminate the messages.

=== The 1994 Pioneer Voyage meditations ===
In 1994, a small group of Ashtar Command members claimed that an extraordinary event had taken place: "the lift-off experience". They communicated via the Ashtar Network that they had been placed aboard the "ships of Light" that were circling the planet. "The Galactic Fifth Fleet" had used "physical vibrational transfer" which involved the human consciousness (or, sometimes, the "etheric body") being raised from the physical dimension and transferred to the "Light ships".

A second event was predicted for December 1994 in which over 250 people participated and which was declared by the leadership to have "opened a portal to the AC (Ashtar Command) ships for ever". It was claimed that in order to participate, a person's vibrations were raised through an eight step contemplative procedure; and that the Pioneer Voyage would occur during the period of a devotee's meditative state and would later be revealed to the individual in some form of conscious recall. This eventually evoked "memory recall" from a core group of Ashtar Command members meeting in Australia who began providing accounts of their "time aboard the ships". Others followed suit. The time on the ships was claimed to be extensive even though the member's meditation period was short.

Helland notes that, despite an increase in complexity, the general themes have remained in accordance with the Australian reports. The claim is that the events are occurring on a spiritual or etheric dimension and not a physical one. The group claims that the purpose of the lift-off is for the ascension of the human race as a whole, to which individual ascension is a precursor and an aid. It also claims that the collective ascension is being aided by large electronic grids deployed around the planet by the guardian ships.

=== Developments after the mid-1990s ===
By the mid-1990s (and continuing up to the present) several of these channeling groups began to utilize the Internet in order to promulgate their beliefs and to attempt to unify the movement by establishing a single "authoritative" source for all Ashtar messages. This led to more prominence in the religious scene and significant membership.

This cohesive response addressed the problem of conflicting, negative and failed prophecies which, after some effort, enabled the Ashtar Command to produce a single Ashtar worldview. Individual channelers espousing messages which differed and continued to focus on themes such as the destruction of Earth, conspiracies, extraterrestrial mass evacuations and general fear-mongering were declared invalid. It was claimed that these channelers had been deceived by negative space beings who had rebelled from the Ashtar Command, made alliances with similar others, and begun operating on the "lower planes closest to Earth".

Most significantly of all, the new, more unified movement declared that in future no new channels would be accepted unless they operated on the "level of the soul". As Christopher Helland points out, this was crucial to the formation of an orthodoxy. Channeled messages from Ashtar would be accepted as valid by the new orthodoxy if they complied with criteria consisting of a set of twelve guidelines which outlined what the movement stood for and how Ashtar would interact with society. This had never been attempted before in the 45 years of channeling Ashtar, who was also presented as a divine figure similar to Jesus.

The new framework claimed that the millions of spaceships believed to be constantly in the vicinity of Earth would never interfere on the planet's surface unless there was a serious problem such as a third world war or an "astrophysical catastrophe". Helland observes that the emergent group was "noticeably more spiritually focused and less concerned with extraterrestrial spaceships and visitors".

He states that very little distinguished the new Ashtar Command from other theosophically influenced groups, except that in 1994 a distinctive component, the Pioneer Voyage, was incorporated into the Ashtar worldview.

== Credibility ==
Helland points out the failure of the July 1952 prediction channeled through Van Tassel that life on Earth will be destroyed "when they explode the hydrogen atom" because in November 1952 the first H-bomb was detonated with no such effect. However, the same message also stated that Ashtar was intervening to stop the destruction of the planet. After the explosion, ensuing messages claimed that various actions were taken by Ashtar's space fleet to repair damage.

Helland notes that the Ashtar belief system is based on faith in an extraterrestrial celebrity, the concept of which has fared better than the individual messages. The main shifts in content seem due to failed prophecy, which has moved the emphasis from a physical space fleet averting doom, to the more theosophical concept of an Ascended Master aiding spiritual advancement. He maintains that the Ashtar beliefs are best seen as a syncretism between the I AM movements and the UFO experience, a belief system which regards UFO experiences and sightings as the natural progression of the spiritual development of humanity. Though followers of Ashtar believe in his divine right and knowledge spread across the human race, he and others of his kind have yet to provide any physical evidence of their existence.

== See also ==
- Ashtar (god)
- Ashtar Command (band)
- Joshua David Stone
