= Otis T. Carr =

Anti-gravity

Otis T. Carr (December 7, 1904 – September 20, 1982) first emerged into the 1950s flying saucer scene in Baltimore, Maryland. In 1955, he founded OTC Enterprises, a company that was supposed to advance and apply technology originally suggested by Nikola Tesla. The claim to be applying some idea of Tesla's was quite common among exploiters of the flying saucer movement in the 1950s; for example. George Van Tassel's Integratron was supposedly based partially on (unspecified) lore from Tesla and partially on lore from friendly Space Brothers from Venus.

Carr patented a flying saucer, and asserted he was working on a full-size version that could fly to the Moon and return in less than a day, using two counter-rotating metal plates, spinning electromagnets and large capacitors, which when spinning charged and powered by a battery, which became "activated by the energy of space." He named this device the Ezechiel Wheel. Carr's scheme resembles slightly earlier proposals by John R. R. Searl and Thomas Townsend Brown. Carr also claimed to have invented "The Gravity Electric Generator", "The Utron Electric battery", "The Carrotto Gravity Motor", and "The Photon Gun".

Ray Palmer's Fate Magazine gave Carr and his flying saucer a great deal of free publicity, not all of it complimentary, throughout the 1950s. Carr and his promoter, Norman Evans Colton, also frequently appeared during the same period on Long John Nebel's pioneering radio and television talk show, and during each appearance, Nebel usually managed to prompt Carr into his usual state of near incoherence; for example, "Can you describe what you're holding in your hand?" "This is a dimensional object. It was designed with the dimensions of space itself. We say it is truly the geometric form of space, because it is completely round and completely square." (Carr was referring to his "Utron Coil", which was round when viewed from above and square when viewed from the side.) The ship was to be powered by Carr also said his great secret could be best expressed mathematically as "minus zero", or "zero X". Colton and Carr did manage to sell quite a bit of stock in their enterprise. Carr also teamed up with obscure contactee Wayne Sulo Aho, and he and Aho toured the various "flying saucer clubs" that then existed in nearly every major city in the United States, touting the wonders of Carr's spacecraft propulsion system.

Although Carr's business affairs were generally considered to be fraudulent, he was granted a patent by the United States Patent and Trademark Office for an "Amusement Device", U.S. patent 2,912,244, filed January 22, 1959. In 1958, Carr struck a deal with the owner of an amusement park, Frontier City, in Oklahoma City, Oklahoma. Apparently, the terms of the deal were that Carr would construct a full-scale, 45-foot (14 m) mockup of his flying saucer, OTC X-1, to be converted into a ride for the park. Carr relocated to Oklahoma City, provided the park with a dummy OTC X-1, and claimed to be readying a 6-foot (1.8 m) "prototype" of his saucer for a demonstration flight at the fairground. Carr said his demonstration model would rise to about 500 feet. He also said he would follow that triumph on December 7, 1959, by launching a working 45-foot saucer, matching the amusement park mockup, and, with Wayne Sulo Aho and himself as pilots, would fly from the fairground site to the Moon and return in a few hours. The 6-foot saucer demonstration was supposed to have been launched on April 19, 1959, but it never even made it to the fairground, and neither did Carr, who claimed to be feeling "unwell" on the day of his demonstration. Visitors to Carr's factory site during the period did not see any actual models of either the 6-foot or 45-foot saucers. Instead, they were shown a small and motionless "three dimensional illustration of Carr's ideas", mostly made of wood. Carr had already dropped from sight shortly before the launch date for the 6-foot model, and was not seen for quite some time thereafter.

In January 1961, Carr was convicted in Oklahoma of "the crime of selling securities without registering the same" and fined $5,000, far less than the sums he had bilked from investors in the area. Carr appealed the conviction, which was denied on March 1, 1961. Carr could not (or would not) pay the fine and served part of a 14-year jail term. Following his release, Carr fled the state and soon resurfaced elsewhere, eventually settling in Pittsburgh, Pennsylvania, still selling non-working "free energy" technology. In 1966, Carr claimed that his earlier demonstrations had failed simply because he hadn't enough time to perfect the device. Carr died in 1982. Aho was believed to be an innocent dupe.
