= Universe People =

Czech and Slovak UFO religion

Universe People or Cosmic People of Light Powers or Heavenly Angels (Czech: Vesmírní lidé sil světla) is a Czech and Slovak UFO religion and doomsday cult founded in the 1990s and centered on Ivo A. Benda. Their belief system is based upon the existence of extraterrestrial civilizations communicating with Benda and other contactees since October 1997 telepathically and later even by direct personal contact. They are considered to be the most distinctive UFO religion in the Czech Republic.

The Universe People are notable for their opposition against the human implantation of RFID chips, which they claim is an attempt by the Saurians, a species of reptilian extraterrestrials, to enslave the human race.

Following the mass suicide of the members of the cult Heaven's Gate in 1997, the Universe People attracted the attention of the Czech and Slovak media as a group with a similar ideology and the potential to commit similar acts, although the probability of this development has diminished greatly in later years.

== History ==
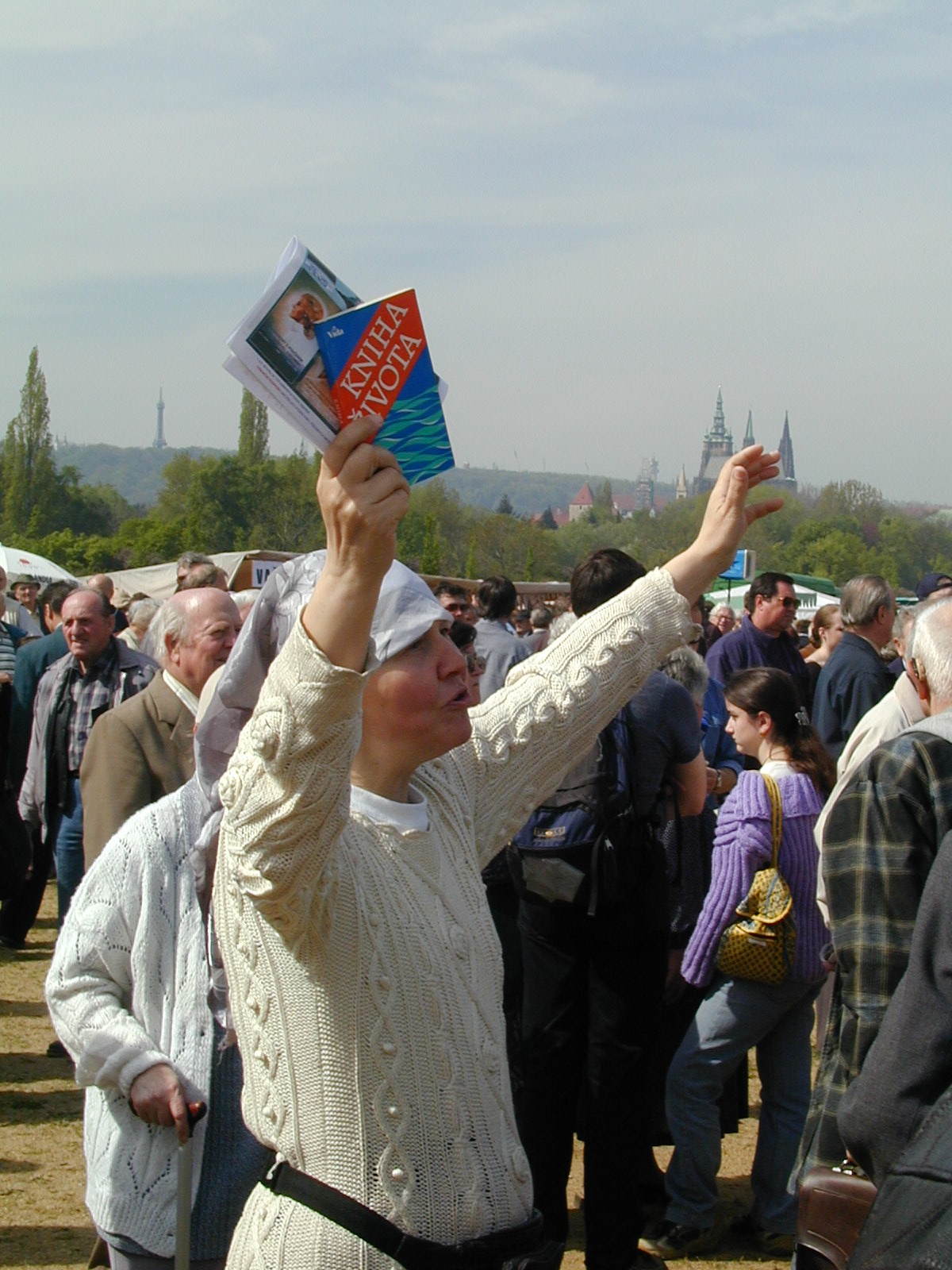
A sympathizer of the Universe People in Prague, Letná, May 2002.

Ivo A. Benda began his public activities in the middle of the 1990s. He has organized more than 180 lectures, visited by more than 12,000 people (according to his own words). In 1997, he published the book Rozhovory s poučením od mých přátel z vesmíru (Talks with Teachings from my Cosmic Friends). At the beginning of the 2000s he appeared in the mass media, such as TV Nova and in the Czech Television. Some of the visitors of his public lectures considered his speeches as a perfect mystification or joke, however, some psychiatrists labelled his performances as a bizarre psychotic delusion. From 1998 to 2000, the ideology of the Universe People was close to sectarianism, with a central idea of coming "chip totality" and an elaborate evacuation of people to a higher dimension of planet Earth. However, their later efforts moved to defence against the attacks of negative extraterrestrial beings, called saurians or lizard people (in Czech: ještírci).

In the second half of the 2000s, Ivo Benda and his group became more publicly known also in Slovakia. In 2007, the Slovak private television channel TV JOJ reported that the Universe People sent instructions on how to defend against attacks of evil extraterrestrial entities to the Slovak Ministry of Defense. The envelopes also contained suspicious material, which alarmed the Slovak Military Police and security services. One of the buildings of the Ministry was evacuated. These envelopes contained instructional CDs and promotional materials of the group. Ivo Benda stated on TV: "If you were attacked by a lizard man from an outer world, the Ministry of Defense should defend the people, shouldn't it? Or do you consider those lizard people as friends?" The suspicion of a security threat was unproven.

== Ideology ==
According to Benda, extraterrestrial civilizations operate a fleet of spaceships, led by Ashtar Galactic Command, orbiting the Earth. They closely watch and help the good and are waiting to transport their followers into another dimension. The Universe People's teachings incorporate various elements from ufology (some foreign contactees are credited, though often also renounced after a time as misguided or deceptive), Christianity (Jesus was a "fine-vibrations" being) and conspiracy theories (forces of evil are supposed to plan compulsory chipping of the population).

Benda based his philosophy on information from many independent books, including The New Revelation of The Lord Jesus Christ (Peter D. Francuch, Ph.D), Angels in Starships (Giorgio Dibitonto), Inside the Spaceships (George Adamski), Bringers of the Dawn (Barbara Marciniak) and others. He also adopted parts of Swiss citizen Billy Meier's philosophy. However, Benda's philosophy is in some points in conflict with Meier's and Meier has declined any contacts with Benda and does not recognize his movement.

Members of the movement distrust modern technologies and control mechanisms of society. They consider mass media to be a tool of oppression and manipulation. Despite this, Benda often seeks contact with journalists to tell his ideas to the public. They often have problems with copyright infringement, because Benda has declared that the only copyright owners are the Universe creatures, who do not consider it important. The movement also wants to abolish money, as they believe it to be the source of many "Control Programs".

== Opponents and cultural impact ==
Opponents consider Benda and some more active of his followers to be mentally ill and the Universe People to be a potentially dangerous cult. According to Zdeněk Vojtíšek (from the anticult Society for Studying of Sects and New Religious Movements), the movement represents a possible danger because of its religious background and similar features to Christianity.

In 2000, Benda announced the organization of the 1st World Symposium of Love, held at the Prague Castle under the auspices of President Václav Havel. Havel's office denied his claims. Benda later stated that three months before the Symposium Havel had said that he would attend, but later changed his mind.

The group's eccentricities have made it a popular target for mockery, both in the form of Internet trolling and heckling of Benda's public lectures.
