= Gabriel Green =

Gabriel Green may refer to:

- Gabriel Green (ufologist) (1924–2001), American ufologist
- Gabriel Green (fighter) (born 1993), American mixed martial artist
