= Reinhold O. Schmidt =

American fraudster (1897-1974)

Reinhold Oscar Albert Schmidt (1897–1974) was a fraudster and convicted embezzler who was one of the more obscure UFO contactees of the 1950s.

== Career and UFO contact claims ==
Schmidt was born and grew up in Nebraska, where he worked for most of his adult life as a grain buyer and dealer. In 1938, he was convicted of embezzlement and was imprisoned in the Nebraska State Penitentiary.

According to Schmidt, while driving through a rural area near Kearney, Nebraska on November 5, 1957, he saw a large, blimp-shaped object on the ground in a field. He claimed two men left the object and escorted him inside it, wherein he witnessed a group of four men and two women speaking a language he described as "High German." The group claimed to be from the planet Venus. After a conversation lasting about thirty minutes, Schmidt departed the craft and ascended into the air, revealing large propellers at each end.

Following this alleged experience Schmidt contacted the local sheriff and brought two local police officers to view the supposed landing site, whereat a greasy, greenish substance was observed. That same evening Schmidt began publicizing his story via telephone, radio interviews and a television appearance. The police were skeptical, and held him overnight in jail while they continued their investigation. After uncovering his prior embezzlement conviction and finding a can of green motor oil near the alleged contact site, Schmidt was transferred to the Hastings State Hospital for a psychiatric evaluation.

== Publicity ==
Schmidt traveled with alleged UFO contactees Wayne Sulo Aho and John Otto on their lecture circuit, and in 1958 published an account of his claimed experience entitled The Kearney Incident Up To Now: The Report of Reinhold Schmidt. Schmidt also contacted exploitation movie producers June and Ron Ormond about making a film based on his alleged experiences. The film, Edge of Tomorrow, premiered on May 28, 1961 at the Wilshire Ebell Theatre in Los Angeles. Shortly after this, Schmidt's 1958 booklet was republished under the title Edge of Tomorrow. Schmidt also had a minor role in another exploitation film produced by the Ormonds, Please Don't Touch Me.

== Trial and second criminal conviction ==
Schmidt relocated to Bakersfield, California, where he continued to present lectures about his alleged UFO experience for the next few years, soliciting money from audience members that, he claimed, he would use to mine unique crystals identified for him by his extraterrestrial contacts. In late 1961, Schmidt went on trial for grand theft, charged with tricking several elderly women out of over $30,000 by claiming that flying saucers had directed him to a mine that was full of "free energy crystals." The prosecution called Carl Sagan to testify that the planet Saturn could not support life, an experience later described by Sagan in his 1966 book Intelligent Life in the Universe, using the pseudonym "Henry Winckler" for Schmidt. Schmidt insisted that the jury be shown his film Edge of Tomorrow. Schmidt was convicted on October 26, 1961, and sentenced in June 1963 to a term of one to ten years in prison.

Following his release from prison, Schmidt returned to Nebraska, where he died in 1974.
