= Sixto Paz Wells =

Peruvian ufologist (born 1955)

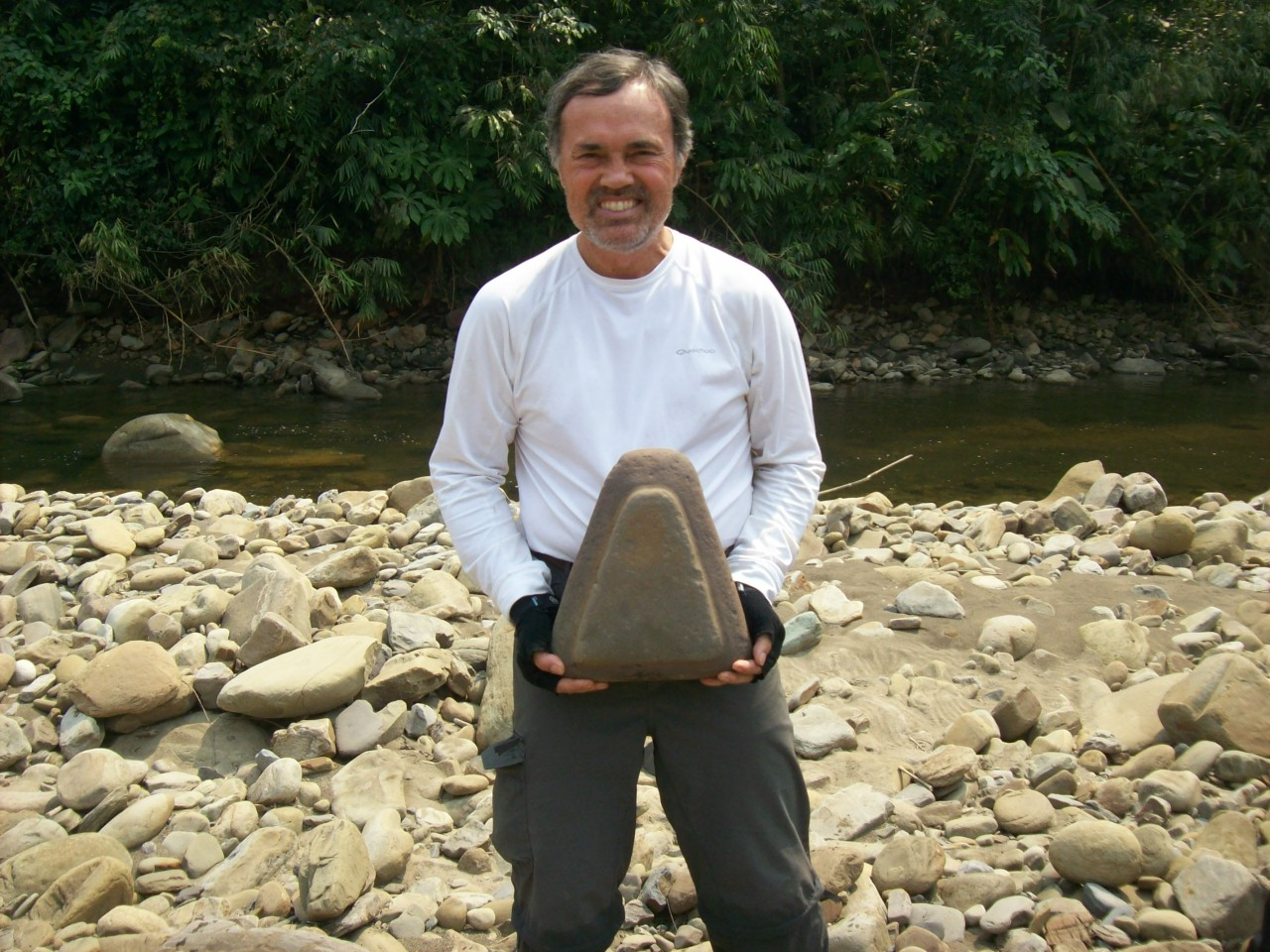
- Paz Wells in 2007
- Born: Sixto José Paz Wells; December 12, 1955 (age 70); Peru, Lima
- Occupation: Author lecturer
- Writing career
- Period: 1985–present
- Genre: Narrative nonfiction
- Subject: UFO
- Website: www.sixtopazwells.com

Sixto Paz Wells (born December 12, 1955) is a Peruvian author and lecturer focused on the UFO phenomena, particularly alien contact, from a spiritual viewpoint. Known as the visible head of the Rahma Mission in Spain and a number of Latin American countries, stands out among the ufologists for having summoned the international press to sightings scheduled in advance on more than ten occasions. As a self proclaimed contactee, he has published 20 books in Spanish and one in English about this subject as of July 2017. In his works about UFOlogy he promotes a systematic method of physical and mental preparation for contact, as well as protocols for documenting, validating and confirming contact experiences.

== Life ==
Paz Wells was born in Lima, Peru, in December 12, 1955, to Rose Marie Wells Vienrich and Carlos Paz García, an astronomer and scientific adviser of the Peruvian Air Force, as well as researcher interested in the UFO phenomena.

From the age of twelve he became interested in UFOs because of his proximity to the Peruvian Institute of Interplanetary Relations (IPRI), founded and presided over by his father.

He coursed primary and secondary studies with the Marist Brothers, culminating his studies in the first place in the Order of Merits.

Sixto Paz, 19 at that time, invites the Spanish journalist J. J. Benitez to a programmed sighting of an unidentified flying object in the Chilca desert on September 7, 1974.

He then pursued university studies at the Pontifical Catholic University of Peru, in the faculty of History.

He was married to Marina Torres from 1987 until her death in 2023. He has two daughters, Yearim and Tanis.

== Career ==
On January 22, 1974, he attended a conference titled "Telepathy as a transmission of distance thought", given by a physician member of the Theosophical Society. That night, after a deep relaxation exercise, Paz Wells received with his mother and sister, a message through automatic writing. The message supposedly was from a being named Oxalc from Ganymede, with the intention of establishing communication with some earthlings. Sixto repeated the group experience, and they all were summoned to a sighting scheduled on February 7, 1974, at 9 pm in the Chilca desert, where according to the attendants appeared a very bright lens-shaped aircraft with windows.

Sixto Paz was interested in communicating with aliens astrally, in dreams or telepathically, and not only physically with their ships, which was the traditional approach of IPRI ufologists.

Similar experiences were happening until August 1974, when the agency Efe spread the news that involved the Paz Wells family:

Lima (Efe). — Five members of the Peruvian Institute of Interplanetary Relations (IPRI) have established contact with a UFO from Ganymede, the largest of Jupiter's natural satellites, said yesterday Carlos Paz García, president of the institution . IPRI members left last Monday for Marcahuasi, a plateau located about 90 km from Lima and at a height of 4200 m, remaining there until Thursday, August 22, bringing important recording material and photographs, said Paz García. [That] material currently being analyzed by IPRI members. Paz García said that the indicated group has been in contact with the aliens for eight months.

— Efe news agency, August 1974

Following the note from Efe, journalist J. J. Benítez was sent from Spain to learn about the unusual experience of Paz Wells teenagers. Benítez did not get involved with Ufology out of his curiosity, but rather found the UFO phenomenon meeting the Rama Mission. Sixto invites him to the scheduled sighting of an unidentified flying object, along with his sibling, Veronica and seven other people at the Chilca desert on September 7, 1974. Benitez saw, as had been announced in advance, two UFOs.

=== Rahma Mission ===
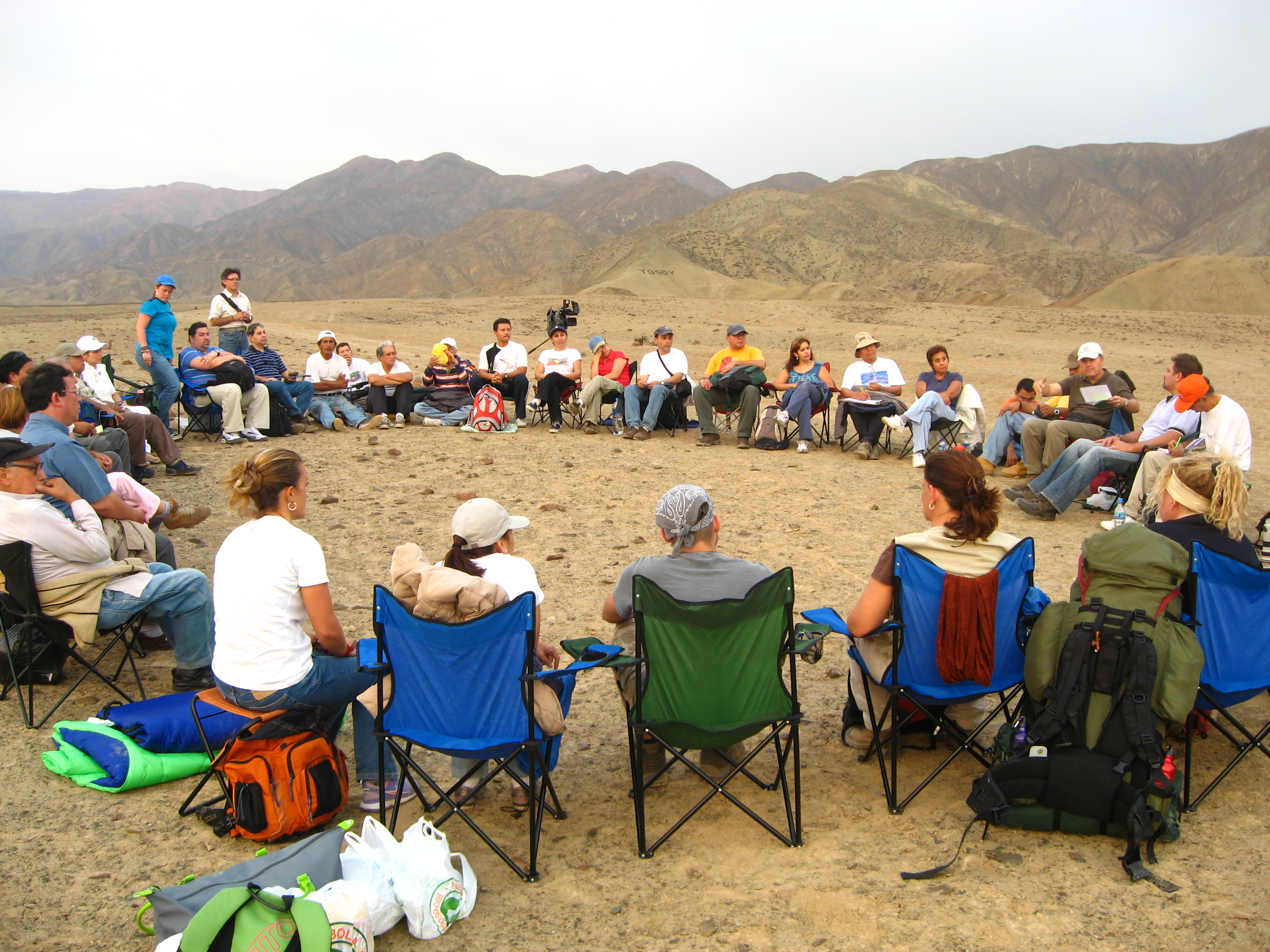
Group listening to Sixto Paz Wells during a field trip on Chilca desert, Peru on March 30, 2009

Originally called the RAMA Mission, it was named after the goal they shared: RA (Sun) MA (Earth), a contact program that seeks to transform the human being into a star, into a Sun on Earth. It was the organization of groups of sympathizers of the method promoted by Paz Wells to contact those who he called "Extraterrestrial Guides".

Through IPRI Paz Wells contacted the "International Society of Divine Realization" where he learned yoga, relaxation, meditation and deep concentration techniques, which he would later encourage among the Rahma groups to facilitate contact. Since the Chilca event of September 1974, together with his sibling Veronica and close friends from IPRI, he began work with groups of enthusiasts in Peru, which were growing and ended adopting the name RAMA Mission.

It was officially dissolved as an organization by its founder in 1990, although there are groups that are still working independently. It came to have a presence in several countries of Latin America and Spain, where it was reviewed as one of the eleven sects or groups that have the extraterrestrials as core of their doctrines.

=== International forums ===
Sixto Paz describes himself as a messenger of peace and hope, rather than a messenger of other worlds. He has appeared in international forums such as the United Nations and in universities such as Columbia University and John F. Kennedy University. In other countries, the University of Montreal, the Universidad Complutense de Madrid and the National Autonomous University of Mexico have also had him as a lecturer.

=== Visited countries ===
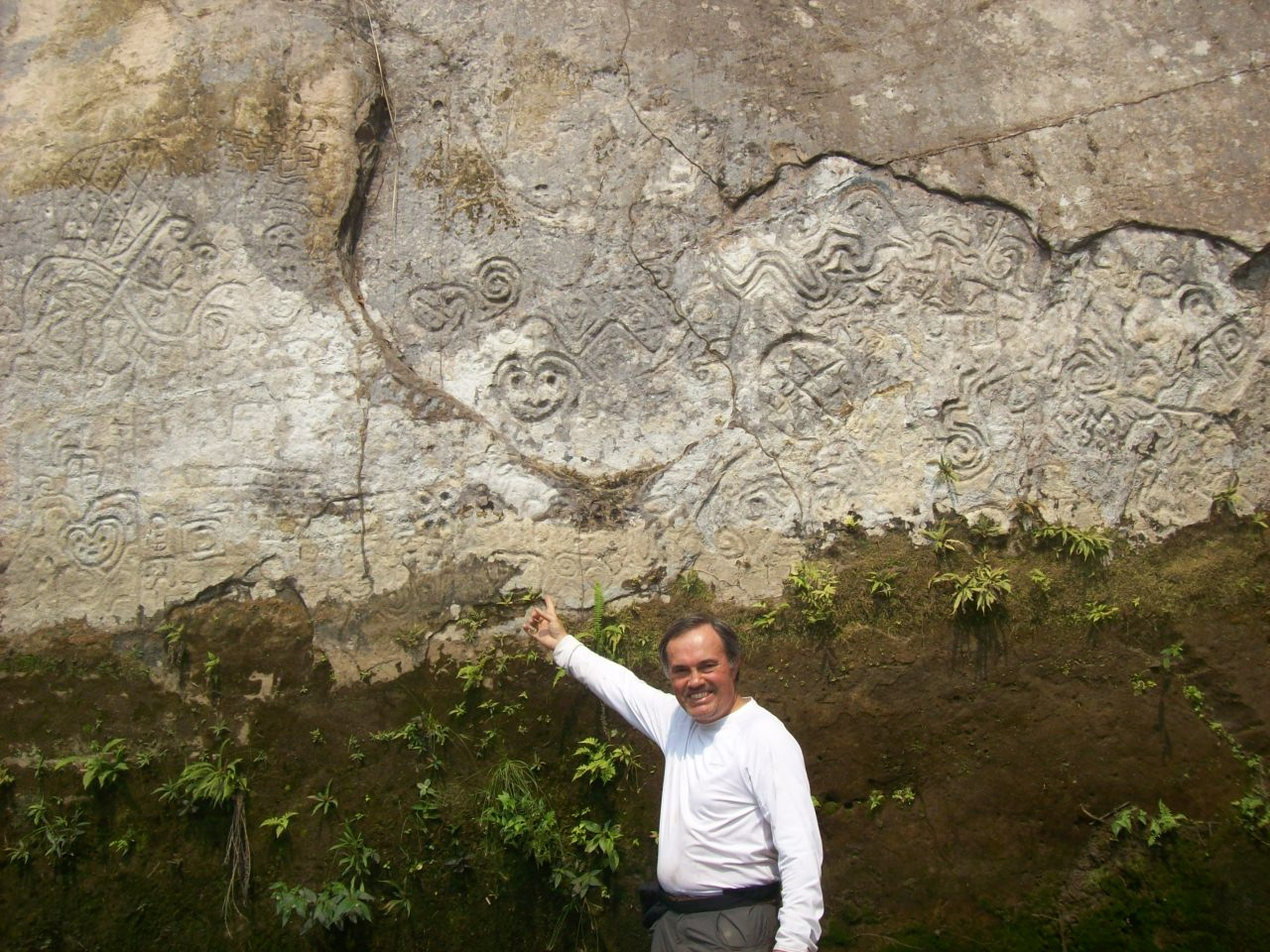
Sixto Paz Wells showing petroglyphs during a field trip to Paititi, Peru, August 2007

Paz Wells travels around the world giving lectures about his take on the UFO phenomena. He has visited Europe, Africa, Oceania and America such as Colombia, Chile, Ecuador, Mexico, Argentina, Uruguay and United States, being most noted his visit to Washington DC in May 2015.

In more than ten opportunities he has summoned members of the international press to witness, record and photograph the sightings of lights and objects in the sky, which the author claims are directed or crewed by extraterrestrial beings who maintain telepathic contact with him and other members of his contact groups. Among these experiences are one of August 1997 on the Valparaíso beach north of Lima, March 3, 2009, in the Chilca desert, in 2014 also in Chilca, and 2014 in Teotihuacan, Mexico.

== Critics ==
As a self proclaimed contactee, Paz Wells has faced skepticism, even from the so called serious ufologists.

On March 31, 1994, Paz Wells was invited to the Spanish television program "La hora de la verdad", in which he underwent a polygraph test. He has been criticized for not passing the test on the question "Have you truly traveled in a spacecraft to another planet?", which is one of the main arguments the author uses to back up his claims. However, Paz Wells did pass all other questions such as "Have you ever been under the influence of a hallucinogenic drug?", "Have you received money from any spy service?", "Have you invented all these stories For exclusively lucrative purposes? ", "Without having to do with this matter, have you ever lied to get out of a hurry?" which he argues in his defense as proof of character. He also says that he failed the question "Have you really traveled in a spacecraft to another planet?" because he claims to have visited Ganymede, which is not a proper planet but a moon of Jupiter, an imprecision that made him stumble.

The Rahma Mission of which Paz Wells was the visible head until its dissolution in 1990 has been described by psychologists and philosophers as a UFO religion and a neo-religious group whose beliefs are very similar to those of Theosophy and nineteenth century's Occultism, while using the techniques from Spiritism. In 1976, his brother Charlie^{n1} settled in Brazil and formed contact groups there with a different orientation than Sixto was giving to the RAMA Mission, claiming that it was becoming "a movement plagued of interpretation errors, struggles for leadership and unclear economic purposes."

== Published books ==
He has written more than 20 books since 1985, published in Argentina, Spain, Mexico, Colombia, Peru, Italy, Germany, and the United States. Some of them have been translated into English, German, Italian and Portuguese.

In English

- The Invitation (2002)

In Spanish

Most of his work has been published in Spanish:

- Los Guías Extraterrestres (1985)
- Contacto Interdimensional (April 1993)
- El Umbral Secreto (June 1995)
- Los Guardianes y Vigilantes de Mundos (1997)
- Una Puerta Hacia Las Estrellas (1999)
- Una Insólita Invitación (April 2001)
- La Antiprofecía (January 2002)
- Tanis y La Esfera Dorada (October 2004)
- Tanis y El Mágico Cuzco (October 2005)
- Antología del Contacto Extraterrestre, 33 Años Después (2007)
- Extraterrestre, Abriendo Los Ojos a Otra Realidad (May 2008)
- El Instructor del Nuevo Tiempo (2009)
- El Parto Planetario (2010)
- 2012 Contacto con Otras Realidades (2012)
- La Muerte como Metamorfosis (December 2013)
- 2012 La Cuenta Regresiva (2013)
- Guía Práctica para Tener un Contacto (October 2014)
- Relatos de Otra Realidad (October 2015)
- Sixto Paz Wells y Los Visitantes Estelares (August 2015)

Novels

- El santuario de la tierra (2017 Kolima books)

== See also ==
- J. Allen Hynek
- J. J. Benítez

== Notes ==
^n1 Carlos Paz Wells is Sixto's eldest brother, whom they are usually referred to as Charlie to avoid confusion with their father Carlos Paz García, also a well known Ufologist in their country.
