= Cosmic Circle of Fellowship =

American UFO religion

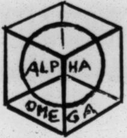
- Symbol used on CCF advertisements
- Abbreviation: CCF
- Type: New religious movement
- Classification: UFO religion
- Founder: William R. Ferguson, Edward A. Surine and Edna I. Valverde
- Origin: 1954; Chicago, Illinois, US
- Members: 41 (in 2002)

The Cosmic Circle of Fellowship (CCF) was an American UFO religion. The Circle was founded in Chicago in 1954 by postman and UFO contactee William R. Ferguson, in addition to Edward A. Surine and Edna I. Valverde. Ferguson had previously spent a year in prison for medical fraud, and claimed he was in contact with a being named Khauga from Mars. He wrote a book on these claims, later published by the CCF. Following his release from prison, Ferguson founded the CCF in 1954 in Chicago, after he said he had received a vision from aliens that UFOs were beneficial and desired to help the Earth. Afterwards several circles were founded in other cities across the United States.

The group's beliefs involved worshiping these higher beings, including Khauga but also other claimed extraterrestrial entities. Members engaged in trance-channeling, through which they aimed to get the higher beings to speak through them. They also incorporated elements of Christian religiosity, also believing they received messages from Jesus. The messages believed to be received from these beings were then studied. Following Ferguson's death in 1967, the CCF continued to publish his works.

== Background ==
William R. Ferguson was a former postman and ex-taxi driver. In 1938 he claimed that he had relaxed so deeply that he had been transported to another dimension. Ferguson reported several UFO or alien encounters, all of which occurred during mediation sessions, and later claimed to be visited by a being named Khauga from Mars. In 1954, he published this narrative in a book published by the CCF, My Trip to Mars.

In the 1940s, Ferguson manufactured and created a quack medical device called the Zerret Applicator, which he marketed as a cure-all. He was convicted of fraud, was found guilty, and spent a year in prison.

== Founding and activities ==
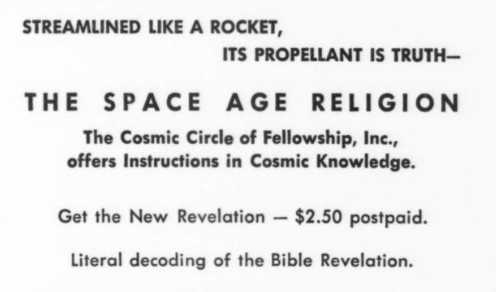
1961 advertisement for the CCF, printed in a UFO publication

In 1954, Ferguson founded the Cosmic Circle of Fellowship in Chicago that year, alongside Edward A. Surine and Edna I. Valverde (also Edna Vel Verde). The group was incorporated in Illinois in 1955. Initially founded in Chicago, Ferguson began traveling throughout the United States in 1958, founding other "circles" in other cities, including in San Francisco, New York City, Washington, D.C., and Philadelphia. There was also one in Siouxland. Ferguson was the group's national president. Ferguson lectured for the CCF throughout the U.S. lecturing on such topics as flying saucers, vibrational healing, outer space, also mentioning celestial beings and Jesus. At one meeting Ferguson sold "joy cups" supposed to treat ailments through combating negative energies, which he said had been transported from Mars. The CCF was associated with a group called the Cosmic Study Center, a Maryland organization led by a Cloe Diroll.

The Circle's second annual "Interplanetary Space Conference" began September 13, 1957 in Washington, D.C. A speaker at this conference was Wayne Aho, who played audio which he claimed was "conversations of Venutians", who "described life on their planet and told of inter-planetary experiences"; this audience included some people from the Pentagon, who the Allentown, Pennsylvania-based Sunday Call-Chronicle noted as "seem[ing] skeptical of the whole thing". The Sunday Call-Chronicle connected this meeting to the supposed sighting of several flying saucers in Stroudsburg, Pennsylvania that had occurred the same day, though said it may be "merely a coincidence". As of 1960, the San Francisco chapter met on Fridays in the Bellevue Hotel in San Francisco, California.

Ferguson died in 1967. After his death the Chicago circle continued to publish his writings. This was later done under the name Cosmic Study Center, with many of the books being published by Cloe Diroll. Ferguson's techniques of relaxation remained the main method to "consciousness-expansion". Following Ferguson's death, Nancy K. Konkle of San Rafael was the spokesman for the group; she described the movement as "an order of celestial and immortal beings organized 12,000 years ago on Saturn in order to emancipate earth people." In 1972, they planned to hold an "experience in expansion" at sunrise on April 16 at Mount Tamalpais, with another meeting later that day. The group had roughly 20 members in 1992, who communicated through newsletters throughout the United States. In 2002 they claimed 41 Chicago-area members.

== Beliefs and practices ==
The Cosmic Circle of Fellowship was a UFO religion. Religious scholars J. Gordon Melton and George M. Eberhart listed the group as one of the "major contactee groups" in 1995, while Michael K. Schutz classified them as a "UFO-oriented religious cult". In an article on the group's meetings, the San Francisco Examiner called the Cosmic Circle of Fellowship "the space-age religion". Ferguson claimed the group's teachings were based "upon the revelation of the Blessed Jesus" and that they were "in harmony with the laws of the Expressed Creation". A key belief of the CCF, shared with many other UFO movements, is that benevolent extraterrestrial beings communicate with the group members and leader directly and often. They also incorporated Christian elements, and were described by scholar Benjamin Beit-Hallahmi as a "UFO-Christian" religion.

The entity Khauga, a "Celestial Being" who Ferguson had claimed contact with, was worshiped as a figure called the Comforter, the leader of a group called the "Universal Brotherhood of the Sons of the Father", which was said to have members from various solar systems. This brotherhood was preparing the Earth for the Second Coming of Christ. The beliefs of the group were that there was a Father of Creation, a being of pure intelligent energy, and a Mother of Creation, who was made of pure universal substance; things were created when the father's rays of life impregnated the Mother's substance. When the New Age arrived, they believed that materialism and evil would be overthrown, with humanity being lifted into "fourth-dimensional consciousness". Various other beings who were said to communicate with CCF members included Melchizedek and Zestra, viewed as the male and female rulers of the Solar System who lived inside the sun. The CCF viewed themselves as linked to both mainstream Christianity and science, as they believed they also received messages from Jesus, who they believed had been brought to earth by a flying saucer (that was the Star of Bethlehem). Their connection to science was from Khauga, who was the "Chief Uniphysicist of the Solar System". Valverde argued that the Bible's descriptions of Jesus indicated that he was an alien. In a leaflet that proclaimed the group's "permanent celestial message", they described themself thus:

The Cosmic Circle of Fellowship is a religious organization of the sovereign State of Illinois, under the complete guidance of Celestial and Immortal Beings from Outer Space. The messenger of these space beings is William Ferguson of the Planet Earth, and other Priests and Priestesses, who have been and will be, elevated to the Priesthood of the Cosmic Circle of Fellowship.

We teach the New Age Truth, given to us by the Spirit of Truth from the Holy Triune.

We worship only the Alpha and the Omega, who are the First Cause, (Everliving). We adore many Celestials and Immortals, who are working with us and guiding us. We invite all people of the Planet Earth to join us in fellowship and the worship of Alpha and Omega.

To join the group, prospective members had to pass through 13 weekly lectures, which was called the "College of Cosmic Knowledge"; if after attending these lectures they were viewed as worthy, they were then "Elevated to the Priesthood of Melchizedek and Zestra", and were told about the secret and more direct meetings. There were partially secret meetings every week that involved listening and studying to the past message, and simultaneously listening to and receiving a new message. The more secret meetings involved receiving messages from this beings through "trance-channeling", in which the higher being would speak through the individual undergoing the trance. Ferguson would supposedly channel from Khauga. Messages received in these trances tended to be of a "quasi-religious" type, with subjects typically relating to how to live a better life, preparing for the Great Cosmic Plan for improvement of the Earth, and how to properly worship these higher beings. These messages were all recorded through tape, mimeographed, and transcribed.

== Publications ==
- Ferguson, William (1954). My Trip to Mars. Chicago: The Cosmic Circle of Fellowship.
- Ferguson, William (1955). A Message from Outer Space. Oak Park: Golden Age Press.
- Ferguson, William (1955). Five Hours with the Oligarchs of Venus. Chicago: The Cosmic Circle of Fellowship.
- Ferguson, William (1959). The New Revelation by the Revelator Himself.
- Regarding the Space Phenomena. Chicago: The Cosmic Circle of Fellowship. 1958.
- Diroll, Cloe (1963). Science of Cosmic Creation. Washington, D.C.: Miracle Hour.
- Diroll, Cloe (1974). UFOs Unveiled. Potomac: Cosmic Study Center.
- Diroll, Cloe (1977). The Comforter Speaks. Potomac: Cosmic Study Center.
- Diroll, Cloe (1983). Overall View of Biblical Prophecies of tile Book of Revelation and Decoded in "The New Revelation by the Revelator Himself. Potomac: Cosmic Study Center.
- Diroll, Cloe (1983). True Art of Creation Revealed to William Ferguson: Blends Scientific and Religious Perspectives. Potomac: Cosmic Study Center.
- Diroll, Cloe (1984). Alpha and Omega: Revealed to William Ferguson. Potomac: Cosmic Study Center.
