= William R. Ferguson =

American contactee (1900–1967)

- Born: July 23, 1900; United States
- Died: June 20, 1967 (aged 66); Chicago, Illinois, U.S.
- Organization: Cosmic Circle of Fellowship
- Known for: Medical fraud, claims of alien encounters
- Children: 5

William R. Ferguson (July 23, 1900 – June 20, 1967) was an American contactee, fraudster, and religious leader. He was the leader and co-founder of the UFO religion the Cosmic Circle of Fellowship. A former mail carrier and taxi driver, he promoted techniques of "absolute relaxation" that he claimed allowed him to travel to other dimensions, and later claimed he was in communication with a Martian entity named Khauga. He wrote several books propounding these techniques and concepts.

Ferguson began to gather followers in the 1940s due to claimed cosmic healing techniques, including a quack medical device called the Zerret Applicator, which he sold as a cure-all. Ferguson was convicted of fraud over his medical claims about the applicator in 1950 and spent a year in prison. Following his release, Ferguson founded the Cosmic Circle of Fellowship in 1954 in Chicago, after he said he had received a vision from aliens that UFOs were beneficial and desired to help the Earth. After its founding, Ferguson traveled around the United States and established several chapters of the organization in different cities. Following Ferguson's death in 1967, the Circle continued to publish his works.

== Early life ==
William R. Ferguson (Note: Name sometimes given as William A. Ferguson.) was born on July 23, 1900. He had one sister. He was a mail carrier and another time a taxi driver. He had five children with his wife, Marie. Ferguson taught himself a technique of relaxation which he called "absolute relaxation", and wrote a 1937 book entitled Relax First which set out this practice. He taught this technique to others.

Ferguson claimed that through this technique of "absolute relaxation", he was able to travel to other dimensions. Ferguson claimed that while he was in one of these states of absolute relaxation, on July 9, 1938, his body became charged with energy, and that he was then transported to the seventh dimension, where he stayed for two hours, resulting in his soul being "illuminated". He claimed that his body was incorporeal upon his return, but that he soon regained his physical form. A week after this, he claimed that he was moved to the "center of creation", now experiencing the sixth dimension, and witnessed creation through "pure intelligent energy" moving through a "cube of pure universal substance".

== Claims of Martian encounters ==
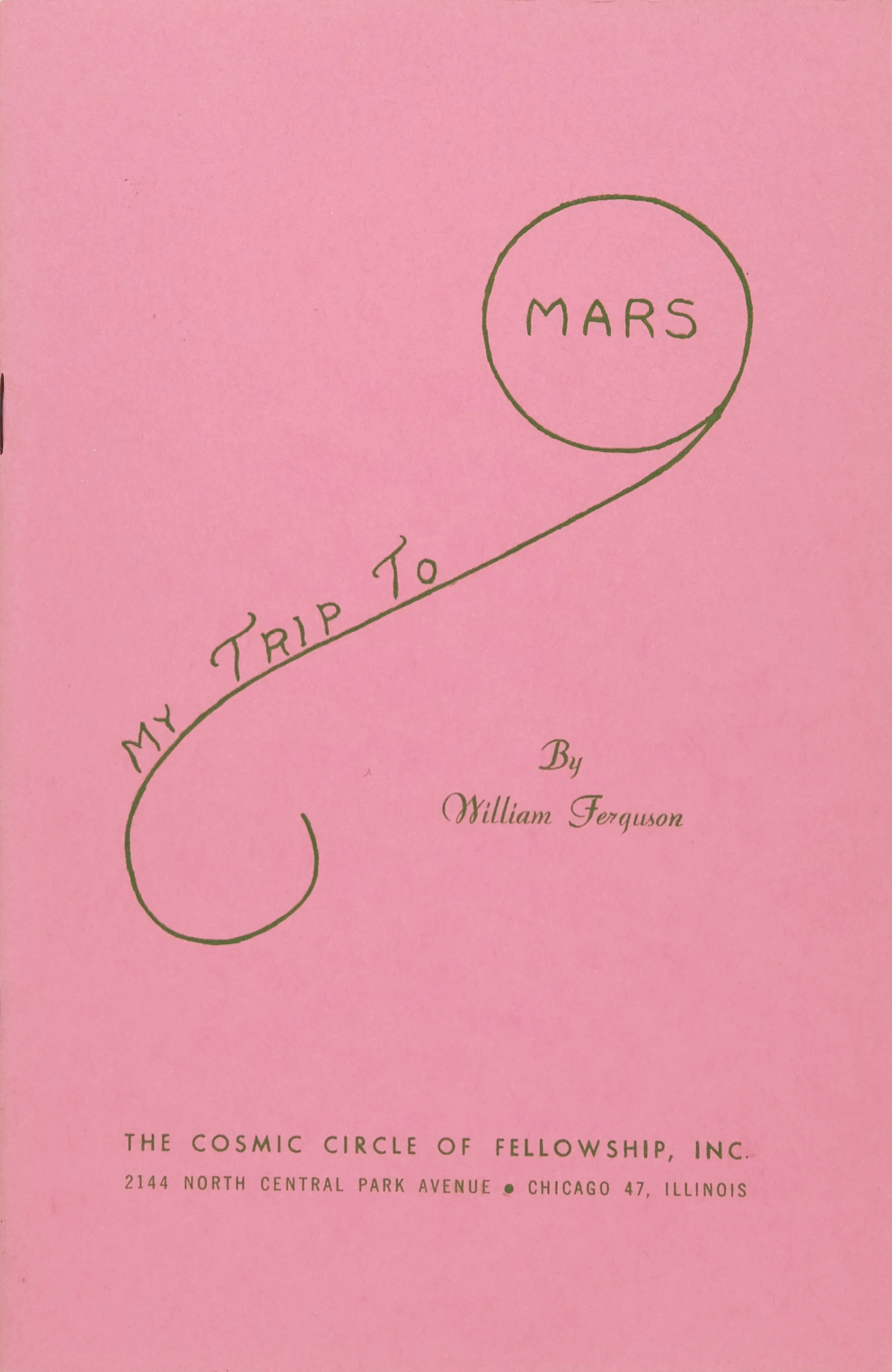
Cover of the first edition of My Trip to Mars

Ferguson, a contactee (someone who claims direct encounters with extraterrestrials), reported several alien encounters, all of which occurred during meditation sessions. In 1954, he published a narrative of his claimed contact with Martians in a book, My Trip to Mars. On January 12, 1947, Ferguson claimed that in a trance state he was visited by a being named Khauga, who was identified as the angel who had given the Book of Revelation to John of Patmos, the Spirit of Truth, and a "perfected being from the Holy Triune". Khauga then took him on a trip to the planet Mars, which he traveled to at the "speed of consciousness". Ferguson said that he had been bodily transported there, but then after arrival he had been remade "along Martian lines". Ferguson described the Martians as being a foot shorter than the average Earth person, being red haired, red complexioned, broad featured, and with the ability to levitate.

Martians were said to be "twenty thousand years ahead of earthlings in spiritual evolution and scientific development". He claimed that on Mars, one could swim in the water without getting wet, breathing was unnecessary, and that the food was simply absorbed and did not need to be excreted. According to his description, Mars had a large network of canals that covered it, with electromagnetic fields shielding its cities.

Ferguson said Khauga asked him to give messages to "other earthlings", assuring them that the world would soon improve, and said he was incredulous that humans could kill one another. He said the Martians were concerned with the state of the Earth, having decided to "release positive energy particles into the earth's atmosphere [...] to counteract the negative energy particles that man himself has released". According to Ferguson, when he returned he was again incorporeal, before he re-materialized; upon his return, he said that the Martians were sending an expedition to the planet Earth. This was a period of many other claimed UFO sightings and contactee events. He believed that these UFO experiences raised his consciousness and provided insight into his life. Later, Ferguson also claimed he had traveled to Venus.

== Zerret Applicator ==
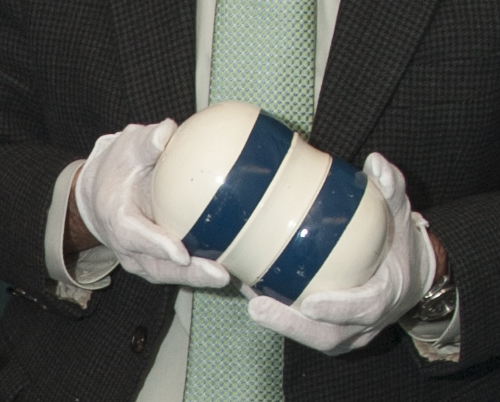
Food and Drug Administration official holding the Zerret Applicator in 2014

In the 1940s, people began to follow Ferguson for his "cosmic healing techniques", particularly a "clarified water device" which he said Khauga had taught him to make. Ferguson created and assembled the Zerret Applicator, or Zerret, a blue and white celluloid dumbbell shaped device that contained "a mysterious fluid". In reality, the Zerret Applicator was made of two plastic globes which were originally from a baby rattle, and the globes contained only paraffin wax, dust, and tap water. It was nicknamed the "dumbbell cure" for its resemblance to a plastic dumbbell.

In 1963, an issue of the magazine Popular Mechanics listed the Zerret Applicator among the "typical fraudulent machines", in an article on quack medicine. Writer Carl Sifakis sarcastically deemed the Zerret Applicator "one of the grandest miracle devices of all" in an article on quackery. The Zerret Applicator was about 10 inches long, and was claimed to contain what was called "Zerret water", which was supposed to produce the "Z-ray, a force unknown to science". The device was advertised as an "atomic cure" that functioned via "expanded hydrogen atoms" and would reverse aging; Ferguson claimed that "life rays from the body flow into the Zerret, are rejuvenated and invigorated, then flow back into the body", expanding the molecules in the body. He said this would result in relaxation and "improve chemistry of the body", which would cure all ailments. Specific illnesses Ferguson claimed could be cured by the Zerret included arthritis and rheumatism. Instructions for usage were to hold the applicator with all ten fingers on both hands, without crossing one's legs, at least three times a day for 15 minutes. If one crossed their legs, it was said to "short circuit" the mechanism.

Ferguson's sales director was Mary Stanakis, who met Ferguson when he picked her up for a taxi ride in April 1946. Stanakis then had asthma, and believed she felt better after Ferguson gave her the applicator. She decided to buy one and afterwards became an associate of Ferguson and his sales director. In July 1946, Ferguson quit his taxi driving job to sell Zerrets. Ferguson had 25 salespeople, and the Zerrets were sold through mail order. The Zerrets were assembled by Ferguson, who sold them to Stanakis, who sold them to a salesperson for $25, who then sold them to the public for $50. Other sales agents sold the applicators in several other states. After being sold the Zerret, several customers agreed to sell Zerrets to others. They sold over 5000 of them, each costing $50.

=== Fraud trial ===
A customer eventually complained to police after not getting a result from the Zerret Applicator. On September 11, 1948, Ferguson, Stanakis, and Flay Smith, one of his salespeople, were arrested in Chicago and were held and charged with running a scam. All three were released on $1,000 bond, and the post office issued a fraud order that banned them from mailing items. Ferguson claimed he was uninterested in money and cared only about helping humanity. In October, Ferguson was charged with fraud by the prosecutor. His defense lawyer called over 40 witnesses, who testified to a judge that the device had helped them. In response, the judge expressed his doubts and stated "I think you are all suckers. But I'll keep an open mind." After the arrests, the devices were studied by city chemists.

In April 1949, Ferguson and Stanakis were charged federally with a violation of the Pure Food and Drug Act, for entering a misbranded therapeutic device into interstate commerce. Attorney Robert C. Eardley said they had sent three shipments of the device across interstate lines, with misleading information. During the federal trial in 1950 presided over by judge John P. Barnes, it was demonstrated by American nuclear physicist Bernard Waldman, using a Geiger counter, that the Zerret contained no radioactive material. Several physicians testified that the object was useless. Physiologist Anton Julius Carlson testified that the devices had no therapeutic value. A chemical analysis was done on the contents of the Zerret, and its contents were found to be the same as Chicago tap water. Stanakis and Ferguson were tried by a jury, which delivered its verdict on May 17, 1950. They were found guilty and convicted of fraud, specifically of entering a misbranded therapeutic device into interstate commerce. Ferguson was sentenced to two years in federal prison and Stanakis was sentenced to a year. Ferguson served only a year in prison.

== Cosmic Circle of Fellowship ==
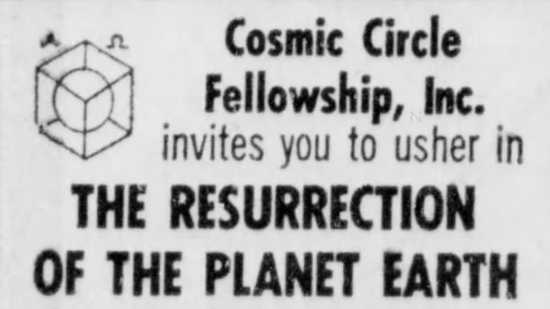
A 1972 advertisement for the religion

In 1954, following his release from prison, Ferguson went on a tour of the Midwestern United States, lecturing about his supposed experiences on Mars for $1 a person and attempting to sell items that he claimed were souvenirs from his time on Mars. Included among these items were "brain-relaxing helmets" and "water-float clarifiers". In 1954, he attempted to sell a policewoman in Milwaukee, Wisconsin a brain-relaxing helmet and other alleged Martian trinkets, told her about supposed Martian food and water, and told her that in 14,000 years she would return to her home planet of Saturn. As a result, the police issued a warrant for his arrest on the grounds of vagrancy. That same year, the Canadian newspaper The Kingston Whig-Standard wrote an article on Ferguson and his claims of Mars travel, calling him a "very remarkable man".

In 1954, Ferguson claimed that he had been picked up by a spacecraft from Venus, where he said that he learned that spacecraft were four dimensional and were typically invisible for this reason, but could also function in the third dimension, and that this is why sighted UFOs seemed to disappear. He claimed that the leaders of Venus, oligarchs, told him to tell the people of Earth that UFOs were visiting them to help, in a time when it was approaching its "next evolutionary step", a "Four Dimensional Consciousness". That year, he founded the Cosmic Circle of Fellowship, a UFO religion. Edward A. Surine and Edna I. Valverde were his two co-founders.

Ferguson was the group's national president, and the group was incorporated the next year. Ferguson began traveling throughout the United States in 1958, lecturing and founding circles in other cities, including in San Francisco, New York City, Washington, D.C., and Philadelphia. Ferguson claimed to channel from Khauga. Ferguson lectured for the Circle throughout the U.S., traveling with a woman, lecturing on such topics as flying saucers and vibrational healing. At one meeting he sold "joy cups" supposed to treat ailments through combating negative energies, which he said had been transported from Mars.

== Death ==
Ferguson died on June 20, 1967 in Chicago, Illinois, and was interred at Rosehill Cemetery. The Cosmic Circle of Fellowship continued to practice Ferguson's "consciousness-expansion" methods, and after his death the Chicago circle continued to publish his writings.

== Bibliography ==
- —— (1937). Relax First. Chicago: The Bronson Canode Printing Co.
- —— (1954). Illumination of My Consciousness. Washington, D.C.: Miracle Hour.
- —— (1954). My Trip to Mars. Chicago: The Cosmic Circle of Fellowship.
- —— (1955). A Message from Outer Space. Oak Park: Golden Age Press.
- —— (1955). Five Hours with the Oligarchs of Venus. Chicago: The Cosmic Circle of Fellowship.
- —— (1959). The New Revelation by the Revelator Himself.
