= Buck Nelson =

American farmer and UFO writer

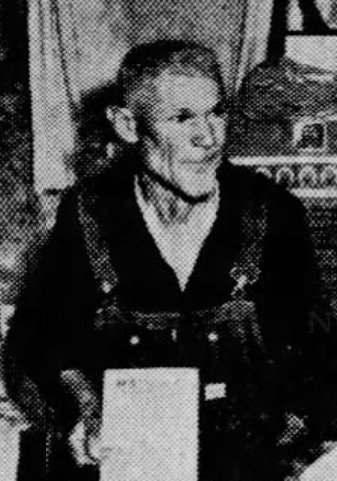
- Nelson in 1961
- Born: April 9, 1895; Colorado or Iowa
- Died: March 1972; California

Buck Nelson (born William E. Nelson; April 9, 1895 – March 1972) was an American farmer who gained some notoriety as a 1950s UFO contactee. Nelson claims to have had an encounter with an unidentified flying object and its human crew while living in Missouri in 1954. Nelson claimed the friendly occupants of the spacecraft to be humans from the planet Venus. His story is contained in a booklet he authored, My Trip to Mars, the Moon, and Venus, published in 1956.

== Early life ==
William E. Nelson, later known as Buck Nelson, was born April 9, 1895 in either Colorado or Iowa. Nelson lived in Riverside, California for several years and worked at March Field as a guard in the 1940s. He additionally claimed to have worked as a ranch hand, sawyer, auto park manager, and Los Angeles Police Department detective. Nelson moved to Mountain View, Missouri before 1954, where he worked as a farmer.

== UFO claims ==
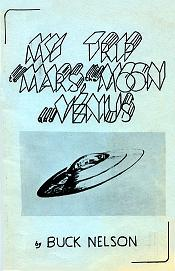
Cover of Nelson's pamphlet of 1956

Nelson was one of several claimed UFO "contactees" who came to prominence during the 1950s. Nelson claims to have seen three flying saucers over his farmhouse. He took photographs and after he attempted to signal the saucers with a flashlight, a beam of light was shined upon him. Consequently, he claimed that his chronic lumbago disappeared and his eyesight dramatically improved. Nelson went on to claim that, after dusk fell, three "friendly human spacemen" accompanied by a large dog, visited him and spent some time talking with him.

Nelson further stated that two of the people from Venus had adopted the names "Bucky" and "Bob" and their main message concerned the "Twelve Laws of God", similar to the biblical Ten Commandments. He claimed to have been taken on trips to the Moon, Mars and Venus. He described how space people told him that on earth, past civilizations existed and destroyed themselves "They had learned of a power even greater than our Atomic power". He said the space people warned him that the inappropriate use of nuclear energy was threatening the earth again; "We are here to see which way this world will use Atomic power; for peace or war. We have stood by and seen other planets, one after another, destroy itself. Is this world next? We wonder and watch and wait. Again I say; give up your Atomic weapons and may Peace be on this Earth".

== Book and reaction ==
In 1956, Nelson published a booklet, My Trip to Mars, the Moon, and Venus, and became something of a celebrity in the Ozarks. He held a successful annual Spacecraft Convention near his farm for about a decade, where he sold his pamphlet, and pay envelopes containing a small amounts of black hair, which he claimed had fallen off the large dog called "Bo".

Nelson used his celebrity to promote segregationist views, claiming that the people of Venus practiced "absolute segregation of all races and nationalities." He also printed and sold pamphlets promoting these viewpoints alongside My Trip to Mars, the Moon, and Venus.

== Later life and death ==
Following the 1966 Spacecraft Convention, Nelson's health declined and he withdrew from public life. In 1969, Nelson's home in Mountain View was destroyed in a fire. Nelson returned to Southern California and died March 1972 in Long Beach, California.
