= Orfeo Angelucci =

American author, lecturer, and alleged UFO contactee

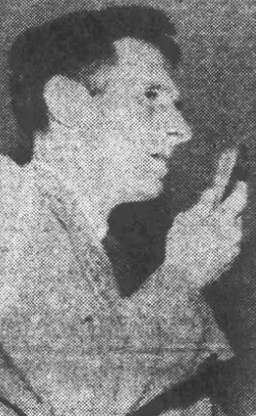
- Angelucci at a 1954 lecture
- Born: June 25, 1912; Trenton, New Jersey
- Died: July 24, 1993 (aged 81); California
- Occupation: Ufologist

Orfeo Matthew Angelucci (Orville Angelucci) (June 25, 1912 – July 24, 1993) was an American author, lecturer, and one of the alleged UFO contactees who rose to prominence in the 1950s. Angelucci claimed that he had experiences with extraterrestrial beings, and lectured extensively on the subject of these encounters during the 1950s and 1960s.

Angelucci's accounts of his alleged UFO encounters have drawn significant interest due to the religious symbolism and spiritual imagery contained within. He felt a responsibility for disseminating information about his experiences, and described himself as an emissary for a "Being" called "Neptune," who visited him multiple times. Angelucci later recalled that his insistence upon the truth of his experiences had alienated him from his friends and family.

When challenged by skeptics to provide evidence for his claim, Angelucci responded that "ideas preponderantly spiritual cannot now and have never been capable of proof by material methods. Hence no material proof of the reality of my experiences may be given to satisfy skeptics." In 1959, Swiss psychiatrist Carl G. Jung examined Angelucci's account in detail in his book, Flying Saucers: A Modern Myth of Things Seen in the Skies, providing a comprehensive analysis spanning around ten pages. The analysis, along with media ridicule, caused Angelucci's story to be largely disregarded.

== Early life ==
Born in 1912 and raised in Trenton, New Jersey, Angelucci worked at a flooring company owned by his uncle. Throughout most of his life, he suffered from recurrent episodes of ill health, which often led to a state of total exhaustion and painful nervous prostration, sometimes requiring him to be hospitalised. One physician attributed the illnesses to a childhood battle with trichinosis, which caused his formal schooling to end in the ninth grade. Despite this, Angelucci remained inquisitive and studied various topics such as virology. One such study, performed in 1946, included the release of weather balloons filled with different varieties of mould into the atmosphere to ascertain the effects of altitude, temperature and air pressure on the samples.

Angelucci married in 1936 and had two sons. Motivated by his fear of thunderstorms and the rumors of their rarity in California, in 1948 the family moved to Los Angeles. Taking up a job on the assembly line at the Lockheed aircraft plant in Burbank, Angelucci worked in the same location as another UFO contactee, George Van Tassel, who was also employed for a time at this plant. Angelucci lived comfortably in California, though he continued to have recurring episodes of ill health.

== Encounters ==
According to Angelucci in his book The Secret of the Saucers (1955), he first encountered flying saucers and their friendly, human-like aliens during a drive home from the Boeing aircraft plant in Burbank, on the 23rd of May, 1952. Shortly after midnight, as Angelucci crossed a bridge over the Los Angeles River, he saw a blue ball of light, roughly the size of a beach ball, following behind him. The ball quickly shifted its trajectory and appeared in front of the car. Angelucci reduced his speed and noted two green balls of light exiting the larger blue one and drifting towards him. Via telepathy, a voice informed Angelucci that he had been monitored since his 1946 mould balloon experiment. The two green balls of light united to form a larger ball of light that became the image of two superhuman extraterrestrial humanoids, with faces resembling that of a male and female. The entities then asked Angelucci to tell others about the supposedly benevolent aliens, before stating that they would return and disappearing.

Following his reported first encounter, Angelucci claimed he was taken in an unmanned saucer to Earth orbit, where he saw a giant "mother ship" drift past a porthole. He also described having experienced a "missing time" episode and eventually remembered living for a week in the body of "space brother" called Neptune. Whilst living as Neptune, Angelluci reported inhabiting a more evolved society located on "the largest asteroid" of the remains of a destroyed planet, while his usual body wandered around the aircraft plant in a daze. He was convinced that his physical frailty enabled him to have spiritual attunement, permitting extraterrestrial contact and imparting knowledge of Beings of immense benevolence.

== Written works ==
Angelucci wrote about his personal involvement and encounters with extraterrestrials, UFOs, and higher spiritual beings in various published books, interviews, and pamphlets.

His published works include "Secret of the Saucers", which recounts his firsthand account of his contact with UFOs and other otherworldly beings. His later works include "Son of the Sun", "UFO Contactees and Reports", "The Nature of Infinite Entities", "Saucers First Contacted Revealed 20th Century Times", "California Soul Rush Days" and "Concrete Evidence". Angelucci's books have been studied and discussed by various UFOlogists and paranormal researchers.

=== The Nature of Infinite Entities ===
Angelucci wrote the first version of his theories of matter, energy, and life, The Nature of Infinite Entities, in 1952, based in part on research conducted in Trenton, New Jersey, in 1946, including the launch of a series of weather balloons used to study the upper atmosphere.

Son of the Sun (1959)

=== The Secret of the Saucers ===
The Secret of the Saucers explores the science and technology of unidentified flying objects (UFOs), with perspectives from physics, biology, and astronomy. It details the characteristics and capabilities of UFOs and the implications of their existence. Within the book, Angelucci studies the numerous documented cases of UFO sightings and describes events that he personally experienced, providing analysis of their technological makeup, propulsion systems, and other physical properties. Ultimately, the book seeks to offer an explanation for the presence of UFOs and to illustrate their scientific possibilities.

Carl Jung featured the report in the epilogue of his essay "Flying Saucers: A Modern Myth of Things Seen in the Skies".

=== Son of the Sun ===
In his book, The Son of the Sun (1959), Angelucci relayed an account he alleged was told to him by a medical doctor from Seattle, known as Adam. The narrative supposedly addressed the same entities and ships as mentioned in The Secret of the Saucers and was a blend of romanticism and otherworldly themes.

One report of the initial interaction between Angelucci and Adam states that Angelucci was encouraged to partake in psychoactive substances partway through their conversation.

=== Other works ===
Angelucci also published several pamphlets about "space brothers," such as "Million Year Prophecy" (1959), "Concrete Evidence" (1959) and "Again We Exist" (1960).
