= Wayne Sulo Aho =

American contactee

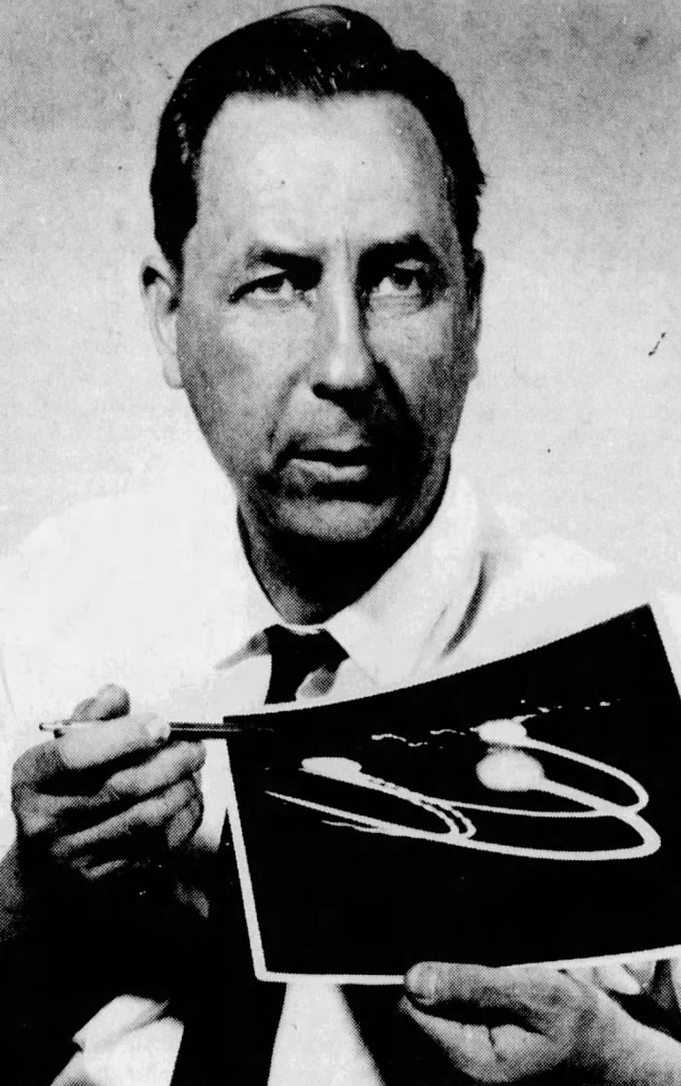
- Aho in 1970
- Born: Sulo Aho; August 24, 1916; Washington State, U.S.
- Died: January 16, 2006 (aged 89); Carson City, Nevada, U.S.

Wayne Sulo Aho (August 24, 1916 – January 16, 2006) was one of the 1950s wave of contactees who claimed to have contact with extraterrestrial beings. He was one of several contactees of this period who appeared following George Adamski and Truman Bethurum. He later became involved in the New Age movement and founded a religious group, the Church of the New Age.

== Early life ==
Born in the state of Washington, on August 24, 1916, Aho was one of seven children of Finnish homesteaders and worked for most of his life as a logger. He was born simply "Sulo Aho" but the name led to him being constantly bullied by his classmates, and so changed his first name to Wayne. He was married. He was a captain in the United States Army Coast Artillery Corps in the 1940s. Aho claimed to have been in contact with humanoid space aliens since childhood, in his case the age of 12.

== Contactee career ==
Aho spoke mainly about a contact he claimed occurred in 1957. Aho and Reinhold O. Schmidt, another contactee went on the lecture circuit together in California, and their double-header lectures continued until August 1958, when Schmidt began lecturing on his own. Aho's presentations tended to emphasize his military service in World War II and spent very little time on "spiritual revelations" he had received from the Space Brothers, either directly or through later sessions with a spirit medium. Aho tended to refer to himself as "Major W. S. Aho," inviting confusion with Major Donald E. Keyhoe, a UFO researcher and writer who thought UFOs were real but held contactees in low regard.

In September 1957, Aho was a speaker at the second annual "Interplanetary Space Conference" held by the Cosmic Circle of Fellowship UFO religion in Washington, D.C. During the conference, he played audio which he claimed was "conversations of Venutians", who "described life on their planet and told of inter-planetary experiences"; this audience included some people from the Pentagon, who the Allentown, Pennsylvania-based Sunday Call-Chronicle noted as "seem[ing] skeptical of the whole thing".

Aho soon became involved with Otis T. Carr. Carr claimed to have built a functioning full-size flying saucer. After a suitable amount of money had been fleeced from gullible elderly attendees at Aho and Carr's lectures, they announced the Carr saucer, piloted by the two men, would take off from a fairground in front of thousands of witnesses and fly to the moon and back in a few hours, returning with incontrovertible proof of the trip. Criminal charges against both Aho and Carr resulted from the inevitable public fiasco, but Aho was later judged to be innocent, himself duped by Carr's improbable claims. He was briefly confined to a mental institution.

== Cult established and later life ==
Like several of the other 1950s contactees, Aho founded his own religious group: the Church of the New Age in Seattle, Washington. Aho also became involved in the New Age movement. He and the group predicted a nuclear apocalypse. Aho's yearly convention held near the entrance to Mount Rainier National Park, in the so-called Spacecraft Protective Landing Area for Advancement of Science and Humanities (SPLAASH), created in honor of Kenneth Arnold, tended to emphasize New Age theories of various kinds rather than being strictly a meeting-place for flying saucer fans.

He died on January 16, 2006, in Carson City, Nevada.
