= Daniel Fry =

American contactee (1908–1992)

Daniel William Fry
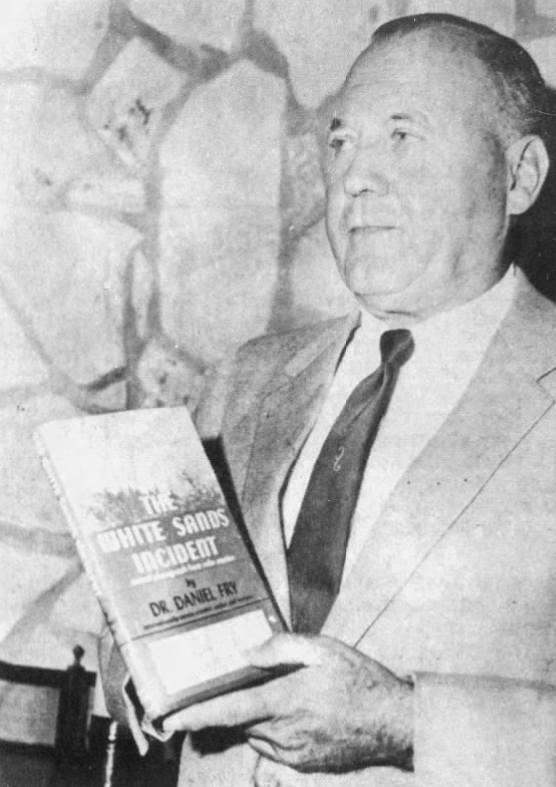
- Fry holding his book in 1967
- Born: July 19, 1908; Verdon Township, Minnesota, U.S.
- Died: December 20, 1992 (aged 84); Alamogordo, New Mexico, U.S.
- Known for: Alleged abduction

Daniel William Fry (July 19, 1908 – December 20, 1992) was an American contactee of the 1950s who claimed he had multiple contacts with an alien and took a ride in a remotely piloted alien spacecraft. Fry was born in Verdon Township, Minnesota. He was also the founder of the UFO religion Understanding, Inc., though Fry insisted it was not a religion.

== Early life ==
Daniel William Fry was born on July 19, 1908, near a small steamboat landing on the Mississippi River called Verdon Township in the northern part of Aitkin County, Minnesota, to Fred Nelson Fry and Clara Jane Baehr. Clara died in 1916 and left Daniel and his older sister, Florence, to be raised by their grandmother while Fred found work where he could as a carpenter and labourer. Fred died two years later in 1918 during the influenza pandemic and left Daniel orphaned at the age of ten. He and his sister were reared under the guardianship of his grandmother and came with her to South Pasadena, California, in 1920. Daniel attended the now defunct El Centro Elementary school and went to high school in Antelope Valley.

His parents left practically no estate and at the age of eighteen he found himself entirely dependent upon his own resources. He completed high school but because of increasing unemployment that preceded the 1930s depression he abandoned plans for university. However, he found what jobs he could and studied during the evenings. He worked through the subjects he would have taken at university by using material from the Pasadena Public Library. He became interested in chemistry and eventually specialized in the use of explosives finally settling on the new field of rocketry.

He married his first wife, Elma, in 1934 and had three children. He divorced Elma in 1964 while living in Merlin, Oregon, and took up common-law residence with Bertha (a.k.a. Tahahlita) until moving to Tonopah, Arizona, in the mid 1970s. There he married Florence, and before Florence died of breast cancer in 1980, they retired to Alamogordo, New Mexico. Fry then married Cleona, a local Alamogordo resident in 1982 and they remained married until his death there on December 20, 1992.

== Career ==
In his professional life, Fry worked as a "powder man" or explosives supervisor in the 1930s and 1940s on such jobs as the Salinas Dam near San Luis Obispo, California, for the Basic Magnesium Corporation and on the Pan American Highway in Honduras. From 1949 until 1954, Daniel worked at Aerojet designing, building and installing transducers for control, feedback and measurement of rockets during flight and static tests. From 1954 onward, Fry helped build the Crescent Engineering & Research Company into a multimillion-dollar company along with the founder, Edmund Vail Sawyer, eventually becoming the Vice President of Research and a stockholder. Crescent made parts related to rockets including transducers, and did JATO rocket nozzle rework during the war.

In the early 1960s, Fry sold his share in Crescent and moved to Merlin, Oregon. In the October 1963 issue of Understanding, he wrote, "During the past year and a half, Understanding has been in the process of a gradual shift of location from southern California to southern Oregon." In Merlin, he ran the Merlin Development Company until moving to Tonopah, Arizona, in the 1970s. There he looked after Enid Smith until her death and managed her estate including property she had donated to Understanding, Inc. Shortly before Understanding ceased to function in 1979, Daniel retired to Alamogordo, New Mexico but a few years later restarted publication of the Understanding newsletter, by now reduced to a single 8" x 14" page, which he continued until 1989.

== White Sands incident ==
On July 4, 1949, at the White Sands Proving Ground in New Mexico where he was employed, Fry had planned to join the Independence day festivities that evening in nearby Las Cruces, but he missed the last bus. Finding the temperature in his room at the Bachelor Officers Quarters (BOQ) uncomfortably hot, he decided to take a walk and explore a path in the desert where he had never been before. There, Fry claimed a 30-foot (10 m) diameter, 16 foot (5 m) high "oblate spheroid" landed in front of him, and he talked remotely with the pilot who operated the craft from a "mother ship" 900 miles (1400 km) above Earth. Fry claimed he was invited aboard and flown over New York City and back in 30 minutes. During the flight and subsequent meetings, Fry asserted that he talked with the pilot named Alan, (pronounced "a-lawn") who gave Fry information on physics, the prehistory of Earth including Atlantis and Lemuria and the foundations of civilization.

Shortly after Fry went public with his story in 1954, he failed a polygraph examination about his claims. Fry also took photos and 16 mm film of supposed UFOs, but subsequent analysis of the original footage has provided evidence both the film and photographs were a hoax.

Later, Fry claimed to have received a doctorate; the "degree" was from a UK mail-order company in London, called Saint Andrew College and was a "Doctorate of Cosmism".

Many years later, Fry also changed the date the event took place from July 4, 1950, to July 4, 1949.

== Understanding, Inc. ==
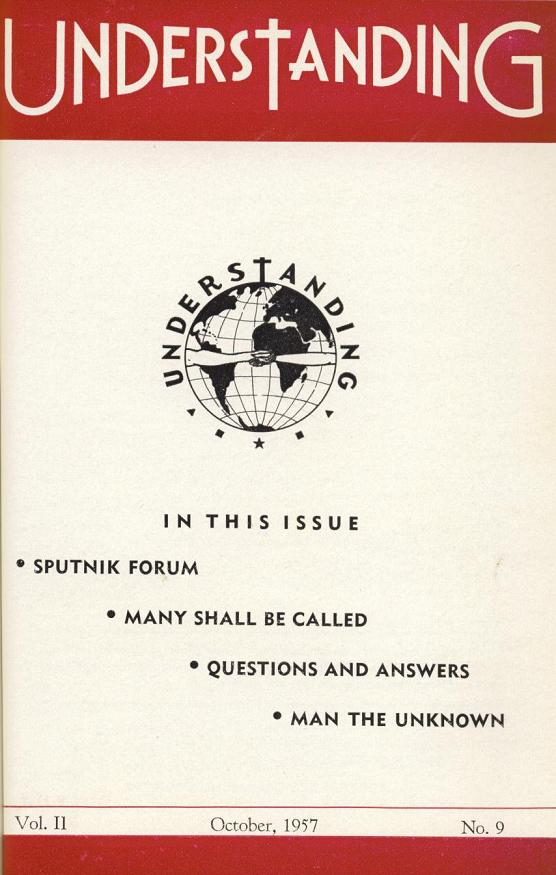
Understanding Vol II Issue #9, October 1957

In 1954, Fry published his first book called The White Sands Incident and a year later started an organization called Understanding which published a monthly newsletter by the same name. Understanding was eventually incorporated as a non-profit corporation, which was described in a 1959 pamphlet as "From a start of nine members at El Monte, California in 1955, Understanding Inc., has grown into an international organization of more than sixty units and many members-at-large throughout the world. These units and members have sponsored hundreds of lectures and meetings, circulated thousands of books and magazines to reach many people in the spirit of 'bringing about a greater degree of understanding among all the peoples of the earth and preparing them for their eventual inevitable meetings with other races in space."

Using Alan's ideas as a foundation, Understanding Inc. served to spread alternative social and spiritual ideas by speeches, meetings and in the newsletter. The newsletter, first published in 1956, was typically about 20 pages long, published monthly and ran for 240+ issues until October 1979.

It was also known as World Understanding. Understanding Inc. peaked in the early 1960s with about 1,500 paid members and 60 or so "Units" in America. Mid-way through its waning years in 1974, Understanding was donated 55 acres (220,000 m^{2}) of land including eight buildings near Tonopah, Arizona, by Enid Smith. The buildings, first intended as a religious college, had the coincidental feature of being round and saucer shaped. Understanding Inc. had fully taken the property over by 1976 but given Daniel's tight finances during his retirement and the falling Understanding membership, the property fell into disrepair. In late September and early October 1978, the kitchen and the library were burned to the ground by an arsonist and never rebuilt.

The group has been classified by scholars as a UFO religion. Fry insisted that it wasn't in a 1969 Daily Courier article: "The group is not mystic, he says, and is not a flying saucer watching organization although some members hold definite beliefs and interests in both areas. Understanding Inc. which is a non-profit, tax exempt corporation, works on the principles that there is nothing that members are required to believe or accept or do, Dr. Fry said." During the early 1970s, Professor Robert S. Ellwood of the University of Southern California studied many new and unconventional religious and spiritual groups in the United States. During his research, he attended a meeting held in Inglewood, California, by members of Understanding, Inc. and noted that, "There is no particular religious practice connected with the meeting, although the New Age Prayer derived from the Alice Bailey writings is used as an invocation."

From 1954 onward, with little reimbursement, Fry gave thousands of lectures to organizations such as service clubs, radio and television stations. He also published other books such as Atoms, Galaxies and Understanding, To Men of Earth, Steps to the Stars, Curve of Development, Can God Fill Teeth? and Verse and Worse. He, along with other contactees would attend the yearly Spacecraft Convention at Giant Rock in Yucca Valley, California for the next twenty years, hosted by friend and fellow contactee, George Van Tassel.
