= Hochdeutsch =

Hochdeutsch is a German word which literally translates to "High German" and may refer to:

- High German languages or High German dialects (hochdeutsche Mundarten), today mostly called Upper German dialects (oberdeutsche Mundarten)
- Standard German, the standardized variety of the German language, which encompasses:
  - Bundesdeutsches Hochdeutsch or German Standard German
  - Österreichisches Hochdeutsch or Austrian Standard German
  - Schweizer Hochdeutsch or Swiss Standard German
