= Ted Owens (contactee) =

Alleged UFO contactee (1920–1987)

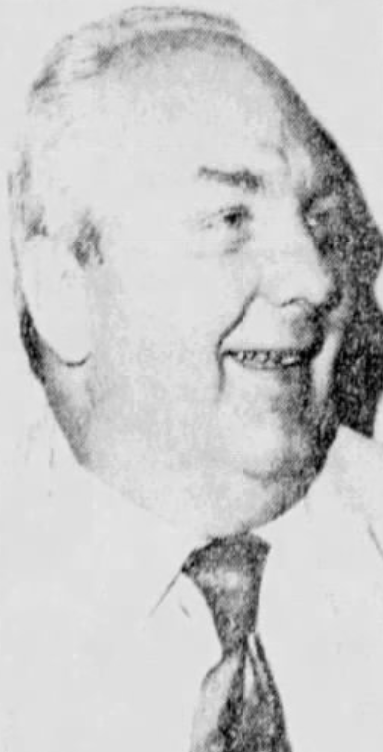
- Owens in 1973
- Born: February 20, 1920; Bedford, Indiana, U.S.
- Died: 1987

Ted Owens (February 20, 1920 – 1987) was an American author and alleged UFO contactee who claimed paranormal powers.

== Life and education ==
Owens was born in Bedford, Indiana, on February 20, 1920. He graduated Bedford High School in 1938. For a time he lived in Fort Worth, Texas, before moving to Norfolk, Virginia.

Owens claimed that he had a genius-level IQ, and that he was a member of Mensa. He claimed that he had been subject to "psychic surgery" by "space intelligences" who had operated on his brain to allow him to receive their telepathic messages. He considered himself a "UFO prophet", and compared himself to Moses, claiming psychokinetic powers that enabled him to not only predict but control lightning, hurricanes, tornadoes, earthquakes, and volcanoes. Dubbing himself the "PK Man", Owens professed that his alleged powers were given to him by space intelligences who wished to call attention to the dangers that nuclear weapons and environmental pollution posed for mankind.

As early as 1965, Owens was the first to claim UFOs were driven by insectoid aliens. He claimed contact with two such aliens, Tweeter and Twitter; these narratives first emerged from channelling experiences, and as a result he was largely viewed skeptically by other UFO researchers. A scholar noted his story as dubious and as seeming inspired by pop culture.

Science fiction and comic book writer Otto Binder alleged that Owens suffered a series of accidents resulting in brain trauma, which he believed were responsible for Owens' supposed supernormal powers. Parapsychologist Jeffrey Mishlove wrote a book about Owens, The PK Man: A True Story of Mind Over Matter, with a foreword by John E. Mack.

== Literary works ==
=== Books ===
- How to Contact Space People, Ted Owens, Saucerian Books
- Flying Saucer Intelligences Speak, Ted Owens, Saucerian Books

=== Articles ===
- "How You Can Communicate with UFO Space Intelligences", Ted Owens, Saga Magazine
