= Gabriel Green (ufologist) =

American ufologist and politician (1924–2001)

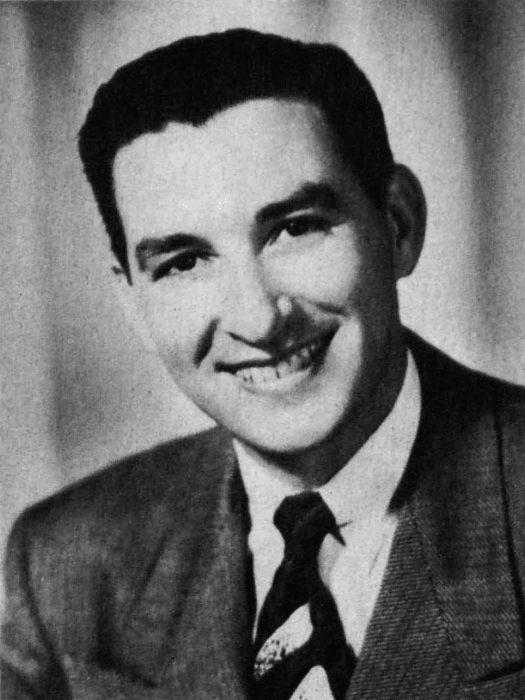
- Green before 1959
- Born: November 11, 1924; Whittier, California, US
- Died: September 8, 2001 (aged 76); Yucca Valley, California, US
- Occupations: Photographer; President of the AFSCA; Public speaker
- Known for: Contactee
- Political party: Outer Space Party (Note: Also referred to as the Flying Saucer Party); Universal Party
- Other political affiliations: Democratic

Gabriel Green (November 11, 1924 – September 8, 2001) was an American UFO contactee active from the 1950s to the 1970s. During this time he claimed to be in regular contact with extraterrestrials, and founded the Amalgamated Flying Saucer Clubs of America. Green had a minor political career, unsuccessfully running for president of the United States in the 1960 and 1972 elections, and for United States Senate in the 1962 election.

== Biography ==
=== Early life ===
Green was born on November 11, 1924, in Whittier, California. He attended Los Angeles City College and Woodbury Business College. He worked as a photographer for the Los Angeles Board of Education until 1959, when he chose to focus on ufology.

=== Amalgamated Flying Saucer Clubs of America ===
After claiming he had observed a UFO, Green became interested in extraterrestrial topics; in 1956 he founded the Los Angeles Interplanetary Study Groups (LAISG), which published the "semi-religious" magazine Thy Kingdom Come. In 1959 the LAISG grew into the California-based Amalgamated Flying Saucer Clubs of America (AFSCA), with Green serving as its director. Green stated that the purpose of the AFSCA was to gain the UFO movement prestige by demonstrating its size, to pressure Congress, and to "hold a national convention". The inaugural three-day convention, which as Green claimed was organized on the advice of the space people, was marred by conflict between the attending clubs. A total number of 45 contactees spoke at the event, including Daniel Fry. In 1959, Green became president of the AFSCA. At its peak, the AFSCA comprised over 5,000 members across 24 countries. The group effectively ceased to exist after the termination of its final publication in 1969, subsequently publishing only occasional information sheets.

The AFSCA continued to publish Thy Kingdom Come, renamed to World Report in 1959 and to UFO International in 1962. UFO International ceased publication in 1965. The AFSCA also published the periodical Flying Saucers International from 1962 to 1969. In 1967 Green published the book Let's Face the Facts about Flying Saucers.

=== Political career ===
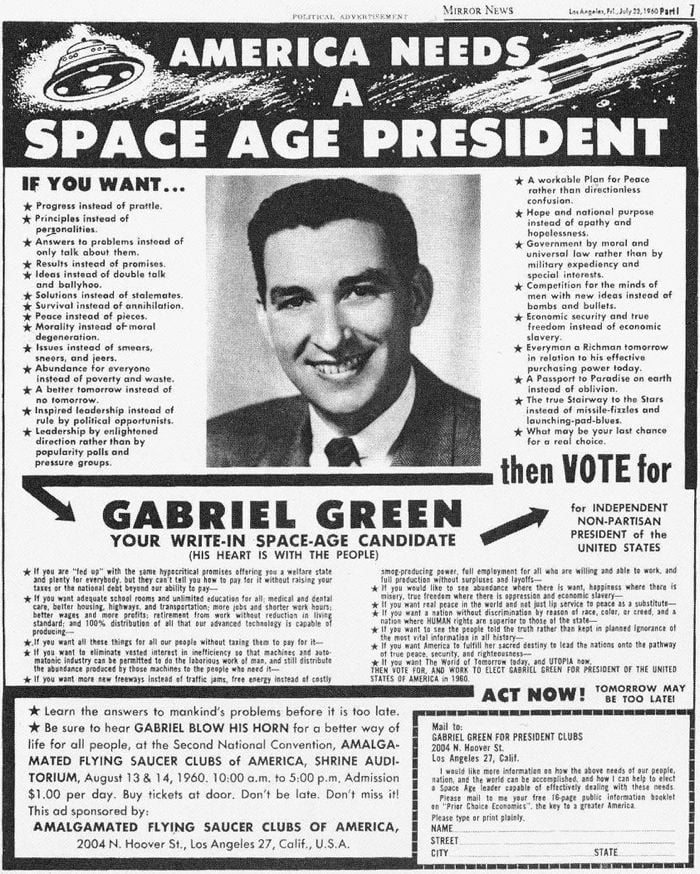
A newspaper advertisement for Green's 1960 presidential campaign

Green used his platform in the AFSCA to run in the 1960 United States presidential election, claiming to have done so at the behest of an alien named Rentan who represented the Universal Confederation of Planets. He ran under the Outer Space Party on a platform of "prior choice economics", an economic system he explained by stating, "Everything is or should be the sum total of all that has gone before". Under this system, Green claimed that there would be a complete abundance, universal health care, free college education, and full elimination of poverty. He also advocated for the banning of atmospheric nuclear testing, releasing all government information on UFOs, and launching crewed missions to the Moon and Mars. Green dropped out of the race before the election, stating that it was difficult to run because voters had not interacted much with aliens. He subsequently endorsed John F. Kennedy, believing that Kennedy would release government information on extraterrestrials.

Green then ran in the Californian Democratic Primary for the 1962 United States Senate election on a broadly left-wing, pro-peace platform. While he failed to win, he accumulated over 171,000 votes and an endorsement from Nobel Prize winner Linus Pauling.

Green ran again in the 1972 United States presidential election under the Universal Party, an outgrowth of a group run by Daniel Fry, who was chosen as Green's running mate. The Universal Party platform was based on an economic system called "universal economics" that Green believed was used by aliens. In this system, people were allocated credits based on their contributions to society. Goods would be evenly distributed to people, but if there were a shortage of a product, it would be allocated based on people's credits. The party also planned to remove systems of representative democracy such as the electoral college and replace them with direct democracy systems. He did not expect to win the election, instead running to spread his ideas. Green was present on the ballot only in Iowa, and lost the election after receiving only 199 votes.

=== Death ===
Green died on September 8, 2001, in Yucca Valley, California. Following his death the few remaining activities of the AFSCA were suspended.

== Beliefs ==
Green claimed that he was in frequent contact with extraterrestrials, stating he had seen over 100 flying saucers. He called these aliens "Space Masters" and the "Great White Brotherhood". He believed that the galaxy was split into dozens of planetary confederations, each with complex alliances and diverse species. However, he stated that his visits with aliens had ended by the mid-1960s. A reoccurring alien figure was Rentan, a 2,000-year-old, 4-foot-tall humanoid from Alpha Centauri who represented the Universal Confederation of Planets, possessed the body of Jesus, and could teleport.

Green frequently lectured at UFO conferences about New Age topics such as reincarnation, channeling, spiritualism, past life regression and psychic phenomena.
