= Ivor Mills =

Northern Irish broadcaster (1929–1996)

Ivor Mills (7 December 1929 – 30 May 1996) was a Northern Irish television presenter and ITN newscaster.

== Life ==
Born in Belfast, Mills attended Queen's University Belfast and Stranmillis College, where he trained as a music teacher. A gifted pianist, he was head of music at Belfast High School before switching to journalism. He presented Roundabout when UTV started broadcasting in the autumn of 1959. After working for RTÉ radio, Southern TV and the BBC World Service, Mills joined ITN in 1965 and was one of its main newscasters for over 13 years, especially at weekends. During the 1960s, Mills was one of the best-known faces on British TV.

After leaving ITN, he worked in corporate affairs first for the Post Office then BT during its privatisation in 1984. In 1986 he appeared as a news reader in Yes, Prime Minister (series 1, episode 8, "One of Us").

Mills was married to Muriel Hay and retired from full-time work in 1988. While he undertook some freelance work, diabetes and a hit-and-run injury sustained outside his London home slowed him. He died on 30 May 1996.
