= Aladino Félix =

Brazilian writer, paramilitary leader and self-proclaimed messiah of the Jewish people

- Born: March 1, 1905; Lorena, São Paulo
- Died: November 11, 1985 (aged 80); Brazil
- Writing career
- Pen name: Dino Kraspedon
- Language: Portuguese
- Subject: Astrophysics
- Notable work: Meu Contato com os discos voadores

Aladino Félix (March 1, 1905 — November 11, 1985), better known by his pen name Dino Kraspedon, was a Brazilian writer, right-wing paramilitary leader, and self-proclaimed messiah of the Jewish people, who claimed in a 1959 book to have been contacted by an extraterrestrial from Jupiter.

== Biography ==
Félix was born in Lorena, halfway between São Paulo and Rio de Janeiro, and is reported to have died in 1985. Félix served in the army in World War II. In 1959 Félix under his pen name Dino Kraspedon published Meu Contato com os discos voadores (My Contact with Flying Saucers) . The book tells the story of his claimed contact with a flying saucer commander, at his home. Félix (as Dino Kraspedon) wrote that he gave the extraterrestrial visitor was given a lengthy Q&A interview in which the visitor explained advanced concepts in physics and gave insights on how to improve humanity's social conditions on earth. Félix (as Dino Kraspedon), later publicly clarified that he did not witness the male human extraterrestrial leaving or entering any spacecraft.

Under his pen name Dino Kraspedon, Félix appeared to correctly predict that there would be a period of terrorism. However Félix seems to have been motivated to fulfill his own prediction since a 2018 Brazilian investigative journalism report revealed that in 1967-68 Félix himself was actually leading a group of 14 police officers in a false flag operation committing acts of terrorism in coordination with a general with close ties to Brazil's right wing dictatorship. The terrorist acts included detonating 14 bombs, stealing arms and explosives and robbing a bank. Evidence shows this terrorism was carried out in order to allow the dictatorship a pretense for tightening their repression of Brazilian society. Aladino Félix was arrested and charged with terrorism in 1968 and served three years in prison.
