= George Van Tassel =

American author, inventor, ufologist (1910–1978)

George Wellington Van Tassel
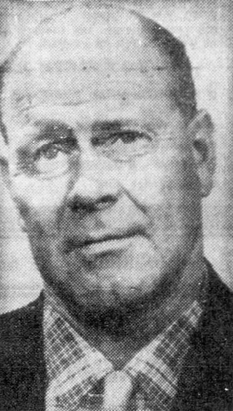
- Van Tassel circa 1965
- Born: March 12, 1910; Jefferson, Ohio
- Died: February 9, 1978 (aged 67); Santa Ana, California
- Occupations: Inventor and Pilot

George Wellington Van Tassel (March 12, 1910 – February 9, 1978) was an American author, inventor and UFO contactee.

== Early life ==
Van Tassel was born in Jefferson, Ohio in 1910, and grew up in a fairly prosperous middle-class family. He finished high school in the 10th grade and held a job at a small municipal airport near Cleveland; he also acquired a private pilot license. At age 20, he moved to California, where he worked as an automobile mechanic at a garage owned by an uncle.

While pumping gas at the garage, Van Tassel met and befriended Frank Critzer, an eccentric loner who claimed to be working a mine somewhere near Giant Rock, a 7-story boulder near Landers, California in the Mojave Desert. Although Critzer was born in the US and an American citizen, others believed him to be a German immigrant, and during World War II, he was suspected of being a spy for Germany. In 1942, Critzer killed himself by detonating dynamite during a police siege at Giant Rock. After learning of Critzer's death, Van Tassel applied for a lease of the small abandoned airport near Giant Rock from the Bureau of Land Management and eventually was given a Federal Government contract to develop and maintain the airstrip.

Van Tassel became an aircraft mechanic and flight inspector who at various times between 1930 and 1947 worked for Douglas Aircraft, Hughes Aircraft, and Lockheed. While at Hughes Aircraft he was their Top Flight Inspector. In 1947, Van Tassel left Southern California's booming aerospace industry to live in the desert with his family. At first, he lived a simple existence in the rooms Frank Critzer had dug out under Giant Rock. Van Tassel eventually built a new home, a café, a gas station, a store, a small airstrip, and a guest ranch beside the Rock.

== Integratron ==
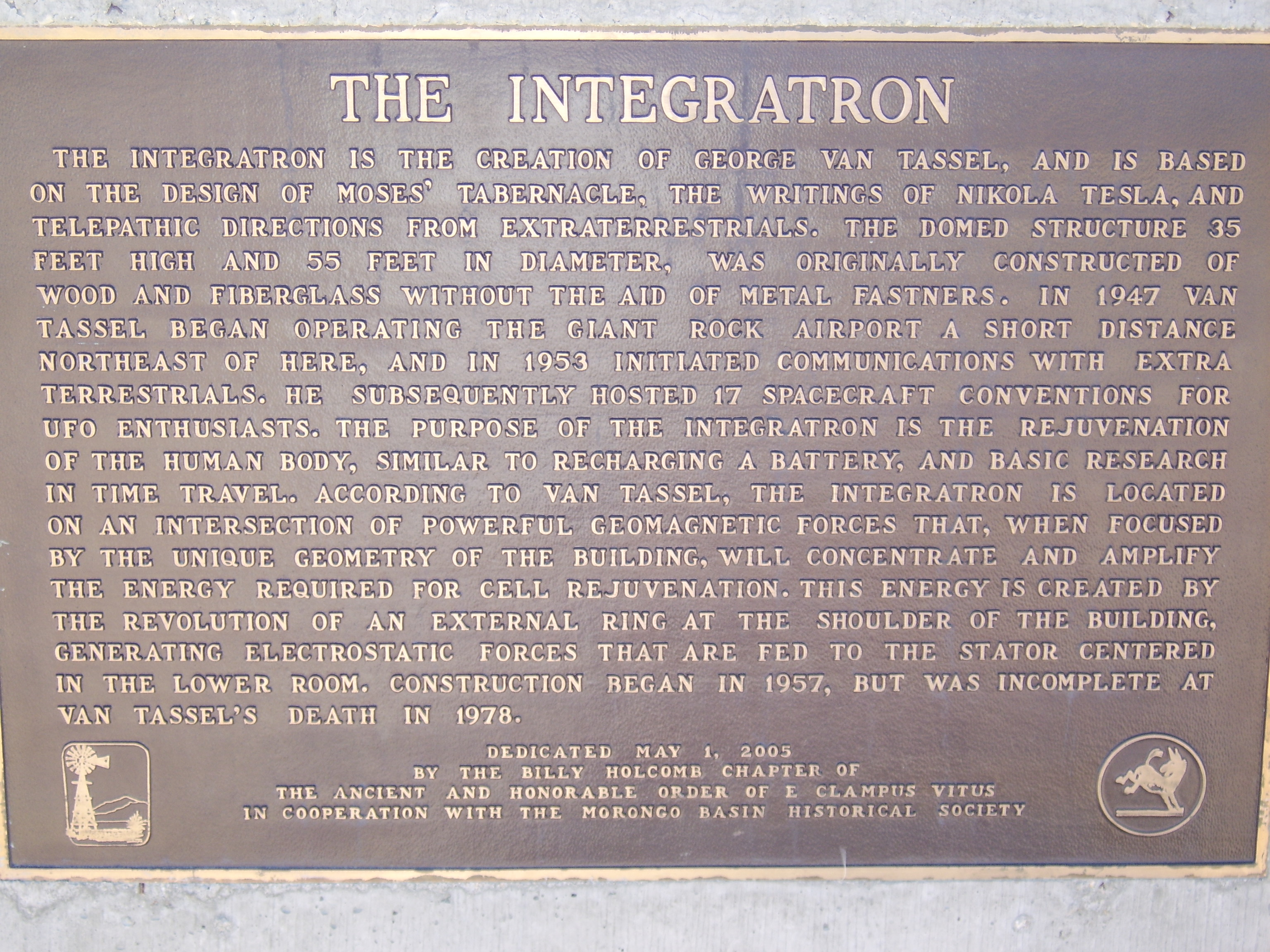
Historical marker near Integratron in Landers

George Van Tassel started hosting group meditation in 1953 in a room underneath Giant Rock, excavated by Frank Critzer. That year, according to Van Tassel, the occupant of a space ship from the planet Venus woke him up, invited him on board his space ship, and both verbally and telepathically gave him a technique for rejuvenating the human body. In 1954, Van Tassel and others began building what they called the "Integratron" to perform the rejuvenation. According to Van Tassel, the Integratron was to be a structure for scientific research into time, anti-gravity and extending human life, built partially upon the research of Nikola Tesla and Georges Lakhovsky. Van Tassel described the Integratron as being created for scientific and spiritual research with the aim to recharge and rejuvenate people's cells, "a time machine for basic research on rejuvenation, anti-gravity and time travel". The domed wood structure has a rotating metal apparatus on the outside he called an "electrostatic dirod". Van Tassel claimed it was made of non-ferromagnetic materials: wood, concrete, glass, and fibreglass, lacking even metal screws or nails. The Integratron was never fully completed due to Van Tassel's sudden death a few weeks before the official opening. In recent times some people who visit the unfinished Integratron claim to be rejuvenated by staying there, and experiencing "sound baths" inside.

== Conventions and organizations ==
Van Tassel was a classic 1950s contactee in the mold of George Adamski, Truman Bethurum, Daniel Fry, Orfeo Angelucci and many others. He hosted "The Giant Rock Interplanetary Spacecraft Convention" annually beside the Rock, from 1953 to 1971, which attracted at its peak in 1959 as many as 10,000 attendees. Guests trekked to the desert by car or landed airplanes on Van Tassel's small airstrip, called Giant Rock Airport.

Over the years, every famous contactee of the period appeared personally at these conventions, and many more not-so-famous ones. References often state that the first and most famous contactee, George Adamski, pointedly boycotted these conventions; however, Adamski did, in fact attend the third convention, held in 1955, where he gave a 35-minute lecture and was interviewed by Edward J. Ruppelt, once head of the Air Force Project Blue Book. It was apparently the only such convention Adamski ever attended.

Van Tassel founded a metaphysics research organization called The Ministry of Universal Wisdom, and The College of Universal Wisdom to codify the spiritual revelations he claimed to be receiving via communications with the people from space. He published and distributed Proceedings of the College of Universal Wisdom from 1953 until his death in 1978. His widow published one more newsletter in 1979.

== Death ==
George Van Tassel died in Santa Ana, California. This was due to an unexpected heart attack in a hotel room just before he was scheduled to give a television show interview detailing his latest scientific discoveries and theories. George was working on an age reversal machine known as the “Integratron” for 24 years of his life, he announced that the machine was 95% complete just before his death. George claimed the plans for the Integratron came from a man that landed in a spaceship one night while he was sleeping outside. He believed this mystery man was an “Extraterrestrial”.

According to his second wife Dorris, George’s body was cremated before anybody was notified. Their house was ransacked during his funeral service and all of his plans, papers, and equipment including many important components of the Integratron were stolen before anybody returned.

The sudden death of this famed aeronautical engineer and UFO contactee, happened just weeks before he was scheduled to operate the partially completed machine known as the “Integratron”. His sudden death along with the mystery surrounding the disappearance of his research lead to many theories that he was silenced by the government to prevent him from unveiling groundbreaking technology to the public.

== Publications ==
Van Tassel's books:

- I Rode A Flying Saucer (1952, 1955), recounts his claims of receiving "cosmic wisdom" from "Solgonda" and a large number of other people from outer space.
- Into This World and Out Again (1956)
- The Council of Seven Lights (1958)
- Religion and Science Merged
- When Stars Look Down (1976)

== See also ==
- Ashtar (extraterrestrial being)
- Ted Owens (contactee)

== Sources ==
- Lewis, James R., editor, UFOs and Popular Culture, Santa Barbara, CA: ABC-CLIO, Inc., 2000. ISBN 1-57607-265-7.
- Ronald D. Story, editor, The Encyclopedia of Extraterrestrial Encounters, NY, NY: New American Library, 2001. ISBN 0-451-20424-7.
