= Contactee =

Person claiming contact with extraterrestrial beings

Contactees are persons who claim to have experienced contact with extraterrestrials. Some claimed ongoing encounters, while others claimed to have had as few as a single encounter. Evidence is anecdotal in all cases. As a cultural phenomenon, contactees achieved their greatest notoriety during the 1950s, but individuals have continued to make similar claims. Some contactees have shared their messages with small groups of believers and followers, and many have written books, published magazine and newspaper articles, issued newsletters or spoken at UFO conventions. The accounts of contactees generally differ from those who allege alien abduction, in that while contactees frequently describe positive experiences involving humanoid aliens, abductees usually describe their encounters as frightening or disturbing.

== Overview ==
Astronomer J. Allen Hynek described contactees thus:

The visitation to the earth of generally benign beings whose ostensible purpose is to communicate (generally to a relatively few selected and favored persons) messages of "cosmic importance". These chosen recipients generally have repeated contact experiences, involving additional messages

Contactees became a cultural phenomenon shortly after the modern era of UFO sightings began at the end of the 1940s. The contactees often gave lectures at UFO conventions and wrote books and articles about their alleged experiences. Though the contactee phenomenon peaked during the 1950s, it still exists today. Skeptics usually consider such "contactees" as charlatans, con artists or deluded in their claims. Susan Clancy wrote that such claims are "false memories" concocted out of a "blend of fantasy-proneness, memory distortion, culturally available scripts, sleep hallucinations, and scientific illiteracy".

Contactees usually portrayed aliens as more or less identical in appearance and mannerisms to humans. The aliens are also almost invariably reported as disturbed by the preponderance of violence, crime, and wars that occur on earth, and by the possession of various earth nations of nuclear and thermonuclear weapons. Curtis Peebles summarizes the common features of many contactee claims:

- Certain humans have had physical or mental contact with seemingly peaceful and benevolent, humanoid space aliens.
- The contactees have also flown aboard seemingly otherworldly spacecraft and traveled into space and to other planets.
- The Aliens want to aid mankind in solving its problems, stop nuclear testing and prevent the inevitable destruction of the human race.
- This will be accomplished by the brotherhood spreading a simple message of love and brotherhood throughout the world.
- Other sinister beings, such as the Men in Black, use force and coercion to continue to cover-up the government's knowledge of UFOs and suppress the message of peace and hope.

== History ==
=== Early examples ===
As early as the 18th century, people like Emanuel Swedenborg were claiming to be in psychic contact with inhabitants of other planets. 1758 saw the publication of Concerning Earths in the Solar World, in which Swedenborg detailed his alleged journeys to the inhabited planets. J. Gordon Melton notes that Swedenborg's planetary tour stops at Saturn, the furthest planet discovered during Swedenborg's era, he did not visit then-unknown Uranus, Neptune, or Pluto.

In 1891, Thomas Blott's book The Man From Mars was published. The author claimed to have met a Martian in Kentucky. Unusually for an early contactee, Blott reported that the Martian communicated not via telepathy, but in English.

=== 1900s ===
George Adamski, the first and most prominent UFO contactee of the 1950s, had a previous interest in the occult and founded the Royal Order of Tibet, a neo-theosophical organization, in the 1930s. Michael Barkun later wrote of Adamski: "His [later] messages from the Venusians sounded suspiciously like his own earlier occult teachings."

Christopher Partridge noted significantly that the pre-1947 contactees "do not involve UFOs".

=== Contactees in the UFO era ===
To support their claims, the early 1950s contactees sometimes produced photographs of the alleged flying saucers or their occupants. A number of photos of a "Venusian scout ship" by George Adamski, identified by him as a typical extraterrestrial flying saucer, were noted to suspiciously bear a remarkable resemblance to a type of once-commonly available chicken egg incubator, complete with three light bulbs which Adamski said were "landing gear".

For over two decades, contactee George Van Tassel hosted the annual "Giant Rock Spacecraft Convention" in the Mojave Desert.

== Response to contactee claims ==
Even in ufology— the study itself limited to sporadic or little mainstream scientific or academic interest—contactees were generally dismissed as charlatans or regarded as the lunatic fringe by serious ufologists. Many ignored the subject altogether, out of possible harm to serious study of the UFO phenomenon. Jacques Vallée notes, "No serious investigator has ever been very worried by the claims of the 'contactees'."

Carl Sagan has expressed skepticism about contactees and alien contact in general, remarking that aliens seem very happy to answer vague questions but when confronted with specific, technical questions they are silent:

Occasionally, by the way, I get a letter from someone who is in "contact" with an extraterrestrial who invites me to "ask anything". And so I have a list of questions. The extraterrestrials are very advanced, remember. So I ask things like, "Please give a short proof of Fermat's Last Theorem." Or the Goldbach Conjecture. And then I have to explain what these are, because extraterrestrials will not call it Fermat's Last Theorem, so I write out the little equation with the exponents. I never get an answer. On the other hand, if I ask something like "Should we humans be good?" I always get an answer. I think something can be deduced from this differential ability to answer questions. Anything vague they are extremely happy to respond to, but anything specific, where there is a chance to find out if they actually know anything, there is only silence.

Some time after interest in the contactee phenomenon had waned, Temple University historian David M. Jacobs noted a few interesting facts: the accounts of the prominent contactees grew ever more elaborate and as new claimants gained notoriety, the older contactees often backdated their first encounter, claiming it occurred earlier than anyone else's. Jacobs speculates that this was an attempt to gain a degree of "authenticity" over later contactees.

== List of notable contactees ==
- George Adamski
- Wayne Sulo Aho
- Orfeo Angelucci
- Truman Bethurum
- Aladino Félix
- William R. Ferguson
- Daniel Fry
- Gabriel Green
- Steven M. Greer
- George King
- Elizabeth Klarer
- Gloria Lee
- Billy Meier
- Howard Menger
- Jean Miguères
- Buck Nelson
- Ted Owens
- Reinhold O. Schmidt
- George Van Tassel
- Samuel Eaton Thompson
- Claude Vorilhon
- George Hunt Williamson
