= George Hunt Williamson =

American flying saucer contactee and metaphysical author (1926-1986)

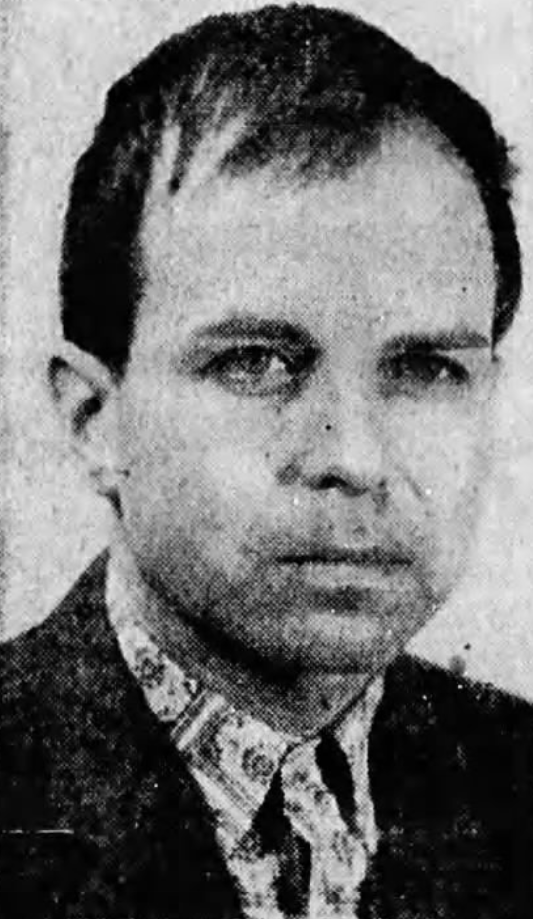
- Williamson in 1960
- Born: December 9, 1926; Chicago, Illinois
- Died: January 1986 (aged 59–60)
- Occupations: Author, lecturer
- Spouse: Betty Jane Hettler Williamson

George Hunt Williamson (December 9, 1926 – January 1986), aka Michael d'Obrenovic and Brother Philip, was an American flying saucer contactee, channel, and metaphysical author who came to prominence in the 1950s.

== Early life ==
Williamson was born in Chicago to George Hunt and Bernice Williamson. He was mystically inclined as a teenager, but transferred some of his occult enthusiasm to flying saucers in the late 1940s. He was a student of archaeology at least as early as 1946, when he recorded a site in southern Illinois. By 1949, he was a student of anthropology at the University of Arizona and did archaeological fieldwork in Lincoln County, New Mexico. In October 1949, he helped found the Yavapai County Archaeological Society in Prescott, Arizona where he lived until at least 1955. Although he apparently did not remain active long, this society was the foundation of an archaeological group that is still active. Based upon fieldwork in northern Mexico, he published an article on fiestas. Although details are uncertain, he was expelled from the university on academic grounds in 1951. He does not appear to have completed a degree, despite putting "Dr." in front of his name.

== Career ==
Having read William Dudley Pelley's book Star Guests (1950), Williamson worked for a while for Pelley's cult organization, helping to put out its monthly publication Valor. (As a matter of fact, Williamson did not know either the man or his work BEFORE August 1953…. well AFTER the events of November 20, 1952, related in Flying Saucers Have Landed… and he worked for Pelley in 1954… See Zirger & Martinelli, The Incredible Life of George Hunt Williamson, p. 101). Pelley had generated huge quantities of communications with "advanced intelligences" via automatic writing, and very clearly was an immediate inspiration to Williamson, who combined his fascination with the occult and with flying saucers by trying to contact flying saucer crews with a home-made Ouija board. After hearing about the flying-saucer-based religious cult of George Adamski, perhaps through Pelley, Williamson and his wife, and fellow saucer believers Alfred and Betty Bailey, became regular visitors to Adamski's commune at Palomar Gardens and eventually members of Adamski's Theosophy-spinoff cult. They witnessed Adamski "telepathically" channelling and tape-recording messages from the friendly humanoid Space Brothers who inhabited every solar planet. The Williamsons, the Baileys and two other Adamski disciples became the "witnesses" to Adamski's supposed meeting with Orthon, a handsome blond man from Venus, near Desert Center, California on November 20, 1952. In fact the "witnesses" experienced nothing more than Adamski telling them to wait and stay put while he walked over a hill, then came back into view an hour later, with a preliminary story of his experiences - a story subsequently greatly changed for book publication in Flying Saucers Have Landed (1953), as Williamson himself later pointed out.

The initial publication of Adamski's tale in an Arizona newspaper on November 24, 1952, triggered an explosive growth in the membership of Adamski's cult. The Williamsons and Baileys continued their Ouija-board sessions, getting their own personal revelations from the Space Brothers, which led to a drastic falling-out with Adamski.

In 1954, Williamson and Bailey published The Saucers Speak which emphasized supposed short-wave radio communications with friendly saucer pilots, but in fact depended for almost all its contents on the Ouija board sessions Bailey and Williamson held regularly from 1952 onward. They heard from Actar of Mercury, Adu of Hatonn in Andromeda, Agfa Affa from Uranus, Ankar-22 of Jupiter, Artok of Pluto, Awa from Outer Space, Garr from Pluto, Kadar Lacu from Saturn, Karas the Space Brother, Lomec of Venus, Nah-9 from Neptune, Noro of the Saucer Fleet, Oara of Saturn, Ponnar of Hatoon (presumably not the same Ponnar who was the exclusive contact of Frances Swan), Regga of Mars, Ro of Torresoton, Sedat of Hatonn, Suttku of Saturn, Terra of Venus, Wan-4 of the Safanian planets, Zago of Mars and Zo of Neptune. The "board" contacts were in good if uninformative English, but the few reported radio contacts, in International Morse code, left a little to be desired. Sample: "AFFA FROM THE P. RA RRR OK K5 K5 FROM THE PLA CHANT RRT IT." Perhaps influenced by the Shaver Mystery, Williamson also reveals that while most space aliens are helpful and good, there are some very bad ones hanging out near Orion and headed for earth in force, bent on conquest.

Williamson became a more obscure competitor to Adamski, eventually combining his own channelling and the beliefs of a small contactee cult known as the Brotherhood of the Seven Rays, led by Marion Dorothy Martin, to produce a series of books about the secret, ancient history of mankind: Other Tongues—Other Flesh (1957), Secret Places of the Lion (1958), UFOs Confidential with John McCoy (1958), Road in the Sky (1959) and Secret of the Andes (1961). These books, when not rewriting the Old and New Testaments to depict every important person as a reincarnation of one of only six or eight different "entities," expanded on the usual late 19th Century Theosophical teachings that friendly Space Brothers in the distant past had taught the human race the rudiments of civilization and, according to Williamson, spacemen had also helped materially in the founding of the Jewish and Christian religions, impersonating "gods" and providing "miracles" when needed. Williamson spiced his books with additional Ouija-revelations to the effect that some South, Central and North American ancient civilizations actually began as colonies of human-appearing extraterrestrials. Williamson can be considered a more mystically-inclined forerunner of Erich von Däniken; Secret Places of the Lion also displays the clear and explicit influence of Immanuel Velikovsky.

Like his role-model Adamski, Williamson enjoyed referring to himself as "professor," and claimed an extensive academic background, which was in fact, completely false. In the late 1950s, he withdrew from the contactee scene and even changed his name, concocting a new fictitious academic and family background to go along with the new name, while continuing to reside in California. His 1961 book was published under a still different pen name. Little is known about his life between 1961 and his reported death in 1986, other than that at one time he became a priest of the Nestorian Church, actually the Assyrian Church of the East.

A number of books by Williamson are still in print, in paperback editions. The only other well-known 1950s contactees whose books are still available are Truman Bethurum and Daniel Fry.

== Bibliography ==
His books include:

- Other Tongues—Other Flesh (1953) Amherst Press. Reprinted as Other Tongues—Other Flesh Revisited: Ancient Mysteries Collide With Today's Cosmic Realities (2012) by Global Communications, with additional material by Timothy Green Beckley, Joshua Shapiro and Sean Casteel. ISBN 1-60611-052-7.
- The Saucers Speak: A Documentary Report of Interstellar Communication by Radiotelegraphy with Alfred C. Bailey (1954) New Age Publishing Co. Reprinted as Other Voices (1995) by Abelard Productions, Inc. ISBN 0-938294-64-4. Reprinted as The Saucers Speak: Calling All Occupants of Interplanetary Craft (2007 and 2012) by Global Communications, with additional material by Timothy Green Beckley and Sean Casteel. ISBN 1-60611-132-9.
- Secret Places of the Lion (1958) Neville Spearman. Reprinted by Futura Publications Limited, 1974. ISBN 0-8600-7011-5. Reprinted by Destiny Books, 1989. ISBN 0892816015.
- UFOs Confidential: The Meaning Behind the Most Closely Guarded Secrets of All Time, with John McCoy (1958) Essene Press.
- Road in the Sky (1959) Neville Spearman Ltd. Reprinted by Futura Publications Limited, 1975. ISBN 0-8600-7144-8. Reprinted as Traveling the Path Back to the Road in the Sky: A Strange Saga of Saucers, Space Brothers & Secret Agents (2012) by Global Communications, with additional material by Timothy Green Beckley, Nick Redfern and Brad Steiger. ISBN 1-60611-133-7.
- Secret of the Andes, as Brother Philip (1961) Neville Spearman Ltd. Reprinted as Secret of the Andes and the Golden Sun Disc of MU (2008) by Global Communications, with additional material by Timothy Green Beckley, Joshua Shapiro, John J. Robinson, Brent Raynes, Charles A. Silva and Harold T. Wilkins. ISBN 1-60611-053-5.
