= Star people (New Age) =

People who believe they are aliens

Star people or starseeds are a type of alien-human hybrid in New Age belief and fringe theory. Introduced by Brad Steiger in his 1976 book Gods of Aquarius, it argues that certain people originated as extraterrestrials and arrived on Earth through birth or as a walk-in to an existing human body.

== Beliefs ==
Steiger described "Star People" in his 1976 book on contactees as "humans who come from a special gene pool linked to visits by extraterrestrials".

They claim to channel human lifeforms and suffer helplessness and total amnesia concerning their identity, origins and life-purpose. The awakening process claimed to be experienced is described as either a gradual series of realizations over time, or an abrupt and dramatic awakening of consciousness. Through the awakening process, they regain memories about their past, origins and missions.

Washington Post journalist Joel Achenbach interviewed people who said they were starseeds from the Pleiades for his book Captured by Aliens: The Search for Life and Truth in a Very Large Universe, and noted the contrast with ufologists: "the starseed are precisely the kind of New Age figures the traditional ufologists can't stand. Ufologists look outward, toward the universe, for answers to the alien enigma. New Agers look inward."

== Proponents ==
Advocates of the concept of star people/starseeds include Sheldan Nidle, founder of the Ground Crew Project.

Steiger recounted that Philip K. Dick had written to him in the late 1970s to say he thought he might be one of the star people, and that his novel VALIS contained related themes.

== See also ==
- Ancient astronauts
- Arcturians (New Age)
- Indigo children
- Nordic aliens
