= Space Brothers =

Space Brothers may refer to:

- Space Brothers (myth), a trope of early UFO contactee legends
- Space Brothers (manga), a Japanese manga series by Chūya Koyama
- The Space Brothers, a British music group
