= Ted Daniels =

Ted or Teddy Daniels may refer to:

- Ted Daniels, character in Adventures of Gallant Bess
- Ted Daniels, musician in Defunkt
- Teddy Daniels, main character in Shutter Island
- Theodore A. Daniels, American bishop
- Ted Daniels (born 1939), millennialist scholar and folklorist, the author of A Doomsday Reader

== See also ==
- Edward Daniels (disambiguation)
