= Space Brothers (myth) =

Extraterrestrial contact narrative

Writers including Tim Callahan have long noted the visual similarities between Adamski's contact Orthon (left) and the 1951 fictional character Klaatu (Michael Rennie). Both appear as human men of European descent wearing flowing 'space age' uniforms cinched tightly about the waist

Space Brothers is a term used for extraterrestrials in several narratives involving alien contact. The term was first used in the 1950s to describe benevolent spacefarers who had supposedly contacted Earthlings. While early 'Space Brothers' were often "Aryan" or Nordic space travelers, later examples such as Close Encounters of the Third Kind and E.T. the Extra-Terrestrial featured gray-skinned Space Brothers with distinctly non-human bodies.

By the late 1980s, stories of Space Brothers had begun to be supplanted by tales of malevolent Gray Aliens who conduct alien abductions and cattle mutilations.

== Benevolent space traveler claims ==
Even before the 1947 flying disc craze, occultists and spiritualists had claimed contact with space travelers. In the 1940s and 50s, people in the Contactee movement described meeting benevolent space travelers who were Nordic in appearance. By 1954, the supposed benevolent extra-terrestrials were being called 'Space Brothers' in the popular press. By the 1970s, stories like Betty Hill's contact with 'Space Brothers' began to be replaced by Barney Hill's story of abduction by Grays.

=== "Nordics" ===
Helena Blavatsky, the founder of Theosophy, claimed she was in contact with benevolent beings with advanced technology and powers. According to Theosophy teachings, these "Masters of Ancient Wisdom" or "Ascended Masters" were variously alleged to reside in exotic locales such as Atlantis, Lemuria, Thule, Agartha, Shambala or even the Etheric plane.

Blavatsky taught that the "most evolved" root race were the "Aryans" -- an ethnic label that, for her, included people from India; But by the mid-1940s, the term "Aryan" had come to connote a Nordic appearance of blonde hair, blue eyes, and pale skin. Students of Theosophy like Meade Layne and George Adamski began to claim contact with advanced "Nordic"-looking beings from Mars, Venus, or Etheria. Adamski's followers soon reported their own claims of contact and interplanetary travels with friendly "Space Brothers", including such figures as Howard Menger, Daniel Fry, George Van Tassel, and Truman Bethurum. The message of Adamski and his fellow contactees was one in which the other planets of Earth's solar system were all "inhabited by physically handsome, spiritually evolved beings who have moved beyond the problems of Earth people".

In contrast with the "Nordic" Space Brothers, other sources imagined Space Nazis.

=== The term "Space Brothers" ===
In the 1953 book he co-authored with Adamski, Desmond Leslie describe Adamski's extra-terrestrial visitor as "a living spiritual being, a man like ourselves, a human brother from another globe of existence".

On December 24, 1954, Chicago area resident Dorothy Martin was covered in a wire service story about her expectation to be soon rescued from Planet Earth by "Space Brothers". Press reports in the following days confirm the prophesized rescue failed to happen. The moniker came to be used by believers in benevolent extra-terrestrials and flying saucers. By 1966, Adamski's alleged extra-terrestrial contacts were described as "Space Brothers".

=== In popular culture ===
As early as 1951, The Day The Earth Stood Still featured a benevolent space visitor who lands at Washington D.C. in a flying saucer. Wounded by trigger-happy soldiers, Klaatu escapes the hospital and begins rooming at a boarding house where he befriends a young boy. Before departing, Klaatu addresses an assembled audience to share a planet-wide warning about the dangers of aggression, violence, and war.

1959's The Cosmic Man similarly saw a space brother issuing a warning to humanity. Star Trek episode "Assignment: Earth", broadcast in 1968, featured an extraterrestrial human named Gary Seven who travels to Earth to avert nuclear war.

External videos
- Easy Rider (1970) UFO scene

The 1970s saw the Space Brothers discussed briefly in Jack Nicholson vehicle Easy Rider. Jack Nicholson's character relays a theory of Space Brothers who are "People just like us. From within our own solar system. Except that their society is more highly evolved. I mean, they don't have no wars, they got no monetary system, they don't have any leaders; because, I mean, each man is a leader. I mean, each man - because of their technology, they are able to feed, clothe, house, and transport themselves equally and with no effort." The content was derived from a secretary on the project who was a believer in Space Brothers.

In 1977, the Spielberg science-fiction blockbuster Close Encounters of the Third Kind told the tale of a contactee who gets to join friendly Gray Aliens aboard their spacecraft. The director returned to the theme in the film E.T. the Extra-Terrestrial.

In 1984, cult classic The Brother from Another Planet saw a Space Brother who is mistaken for an African-American. Also in 1984, The Adventures of Buckaroo Banzai Across the 8th Dimension featured benevolent aliens who appear and sound Jamaican. 1987 comedy Real Men told of a CIA agent on a quest to meet with benevolent aliens offering a way to heal Earth's dying ecosystem. The 2000 stoner comedy Dude, Where's My Car? saw protagonists interacting with a variety of factions vying for possession of an alien artifact; One faction, explicitly called "Nordic", are revealed to be benevolent.

== Contrast with later UFO conspiracy theories ==
By the 1980s, stories of benevolent Space Brothers had begun to be supplanted by conspiracy theories of malevolent Grays responsible for alien abductions and cattle mutilations.
