= James W. Moseley =

American UFO commentator (1931–2012)

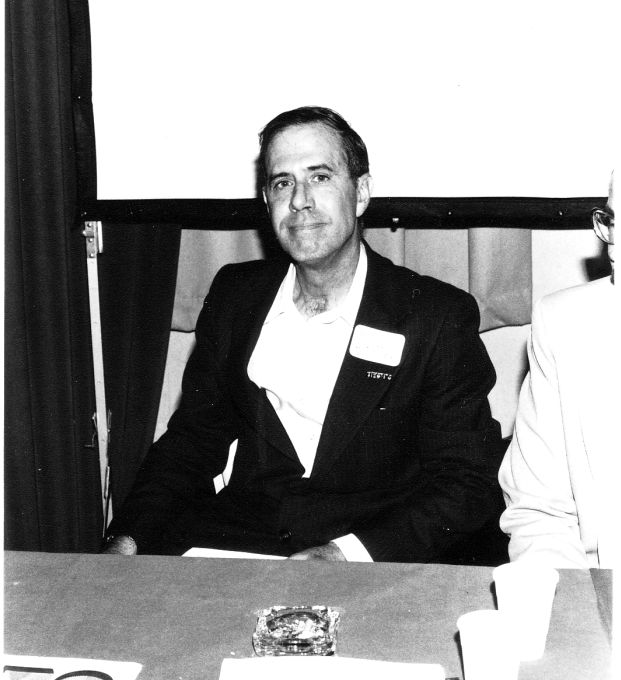
- James Moseley at the 1980 National UFO Conference in New York
- Born: James Willett Moseley; August 4, 1931; New York
- Died: November 16, 2012 (aged 81); Key West, Florida
- Citizenship: United States of America
- Known for: Newsletter Saucer Smear
- Scientific career
- Fields: UFOlogist

James Willett Moseley (August 4, 1931 – November 16, 2012) was an American observer, author, and commentator on the subject of unidentified flying objects (UFOs). Over his nearly sixty-year career, he exposed UFO hoaxes and engineered hoaxes of his own. He was best known as the publisher of the UFO newsletters Saucer News and its successor Saucer Smear, which became the longest continuously published UFO journal in the world.

Many in the UFO community considered Moseley to be a skeptic, as Moseley reported that over the years he accepted, then rejected, a number of explanations for UFOs. According to Jerome Clark, he "entertained just about every view it is possible to hold about UFOs," and according to Antonio Huneeus, "Moseley was critical and sarcastic regarding just about everything and everybody in UFOlogy. Yet Jim did believe a core of the UFO phenomenon was real and truly unexplained after filtering out all the hoaxes, conspiracy theories, mis-identifications and just plain nonsense that pervades much of the field."

== Biography ==
=== Early life ===
James Moseley was the son of U.S. Army Major General George Van Horn Moseley, chief of the 4th Section (supplies and evacuation) of General Pershing's Wartime General Staff, and Florence Barber Moseley (née DuBois) whose family owned the Barber Steamship Lines. His parents were married in July 1930, at which time his father was already 55 years old, and James was born the following year. His childhood was spent on army bases until his father's retirement in 1938.

James never got along with his father, taking particular exception to his outspoken racist and anti-semitic views, including his claims that America must "breed up" its own decaying population by copying Nazi eugenics practices, and launch a program of "selective breeding, sterilization, the elimination of the unfit, and the elimination of those types which are inimical to the general welfare of the nation."

=== 1950s ===
His mother died in December 1950, leaving the nineteen-year-old James the beneficiary of a large trust fund. Moseley inherited sufficient money to be able to pursue his own interests, and he never worked a conventional career. He left Princeton University, and spent much of his time initially traveling to South America to engage in what he called "grave robbing" of pre-Columbian artifacts, then later travelling to UFO conferences, interviewing UFO witnesses and personalities.

Moseley took up amateur archaeology and he made many trips to Peru, and to a lesser extent Ecuador and northern Chile, purchasing and digging up pre-Columbian antiquities. The distinction between archaeology and treasure hunting or grave-robbing was not always clear, and some of his activities may not be approved today. Even so, he made some significant finds and several of the mummies he found were placed in Peruvian museums by professional archaeologists. After Nazca Lines were first discovered by the Peruvian archaeologist Toribio Mejia Xesspe in 1927, Moseley was the first to suggest that there were intriguing Fortean phenomena in Fate Magazine, in October 1955, suggesting a mysterious origin, long before they interested alternative writers such as Erich von Däniken (1968), Henri Stierlin (1983) and Gerald Hawkins (1990). These South American trips indirectly led to his flying saucer involvement, when he agreed to collaborate on a book with Ken Krippene.

His interest in UFOs grew out of the incidents involving pilots Kenneth Arnold in 1947 and Thomas Mantell in 1948. His flying saucer career really began in 1953 when he drove across the country "tracking the elusive flying saucer" in preparation for his planned book. He interviewed almost 100 UFO experts and eyewitnesses: he visited the Pentagon and examined their files on UFO investigations; he visited the Project Blue Book facilities at Wright-Patterson Air Force Base in Dayton, Ohio, meeting Col. Bob Friend; he interviewed the famous saucer author Major Donald E. Keyhoe, and felt that "Keyhoe routinely made too much out of too little, at least in part just to sell books"; he went to Mt. Palomar, California, where "Professor [George] Adamski was holding court" in his hamburger stand; he met Gray Barker, who was to become his long-time friend and collaborator; he interviewed best-selling author Frank Scully; he attended the "Giant Rock" contactee convention and interviewed many witnesses, researchers and officials. He even met former President Harry S. Truman at his office in Independence, Missouri, and asked him about flying saucers. In what became one of Moseley's favorite anecdotes, Truman responded jokingly, "I’ve never seen a purple cow, I never hope to see one."

When he returned from this trip, Moseley founded the organization S.A.U.C.E.R.S. (Saucers And Unexplained Celestial Events Research Society). The book with Ken Krippene never eventuated, but Moseley's interest in UFOs deepened during his research and he also came to a realization: "I had discovered I wasn’t cut out to be a serious UFOlogist, unless of course one was to count the work I did exposing Adamski and, as time went on, certain other fakers and frauds."

In July, 1954, Moseley co-founded Saucer News (originally titled Nexus), a periodical known for its unorthodox, "freewheeling" style. Beyond the fake feuds (particularly with Gray Barker) and occasional hoaxes, Saucer News also featured serious research and reporting about UFOs, drawing heavily on the material he had gathered during his 1953 cross-country trip. Moseley was among the first to publicize evidence against George Adamski's claims of alien contact in number of issues, culminating in a special exposé issue of Saucer News, and he reported his investigation into the Ralph Horton flying saucer crash, which he also conducted during the 1953 trip.

=== 1960s ===
Through the 1960s, Moseley became increasingly active among the UFO community, and his public profile grew. He gave many lectures about flying saucers, and even made several trips to Giant Rock in the California desert, then a popular annual convention contactees and their followers. He was a semi-regular guest of Long John Nebel's radio show which dealt mainly with anomalous phenomena, UFOs, and other offbeat topics. After that, Mosely moved on to become a regular guest of James Randi on The Amazing Randi Show, also on New York City radio station WOR. In later years, Moseley fell out with both men, referring to them as his enemies.Jim Moseley (and other well-known New York paranormal researchers) was also a regular guest on the weekly talk show "Coffee Klatsch" hosted by Bob Zanotti on New York area radio station WFMU.

In 1966, there was a new wave of UFO publicity, kicked off by the incident in Michigan where Allen Hynek offered his "swamp gas" explanation which became famous. Moseley's lecturing became more popular after this: the story was hot... "back in New York City, all the major national news organizations were rushing around trying to find an instant saucer expert to interview and quote. Mine was the only listing in the Manhattan phone book under "Saucers" (for Saucer News), so everyone came to me." To give his readers a sense of this activity, Moseley published his appearance schedule in Saucer News: during the month of April 1967, for example, he delivered nine formal lectures at universities and colleges, and he gave another six media interviews. Around this time was also when he and Barker made the hoax Lost Creek saucer video.

Moseley attended the first large-scale gathering of the Congress of Scientific UFOlogists in Cleveland, Ohio in June of 1964, and he publicized it in his Saucer News. After two more successful gatherings in Cleveland, Moseley decided to hold a really big convention in New York City in 1967. He arranged a wide range of well-known speakers, including Joe Franklin of WOR-TV, Gordon Evans, Art Ford, Frank Stranges, John Keel, Stewart Robb, Gray Barker, James Randi, Long John Nebel, Howard Menger, Ivan Sanderson, and Roy Thinnes, the star of the hit ABC-TV science fiction thriller The Invaders. He secured the Grand Ballroom as well as the East Ballroom of the huge Hotel Commodore, right in the heart of Manhattan. Many UFO publications publicized the event, particularly since 1967 was the 20th anniversary of the Kenneth Arnold sighting. This "NYC Saucer Con" was a great success, with total attendance variously estimated from "well over a thousand" to six thousand people. In 1971, Moseley became Permanent Chairman of the National UFO Conference (NUFOC), whose main purpose was to organize and run an annual meeting or convention.

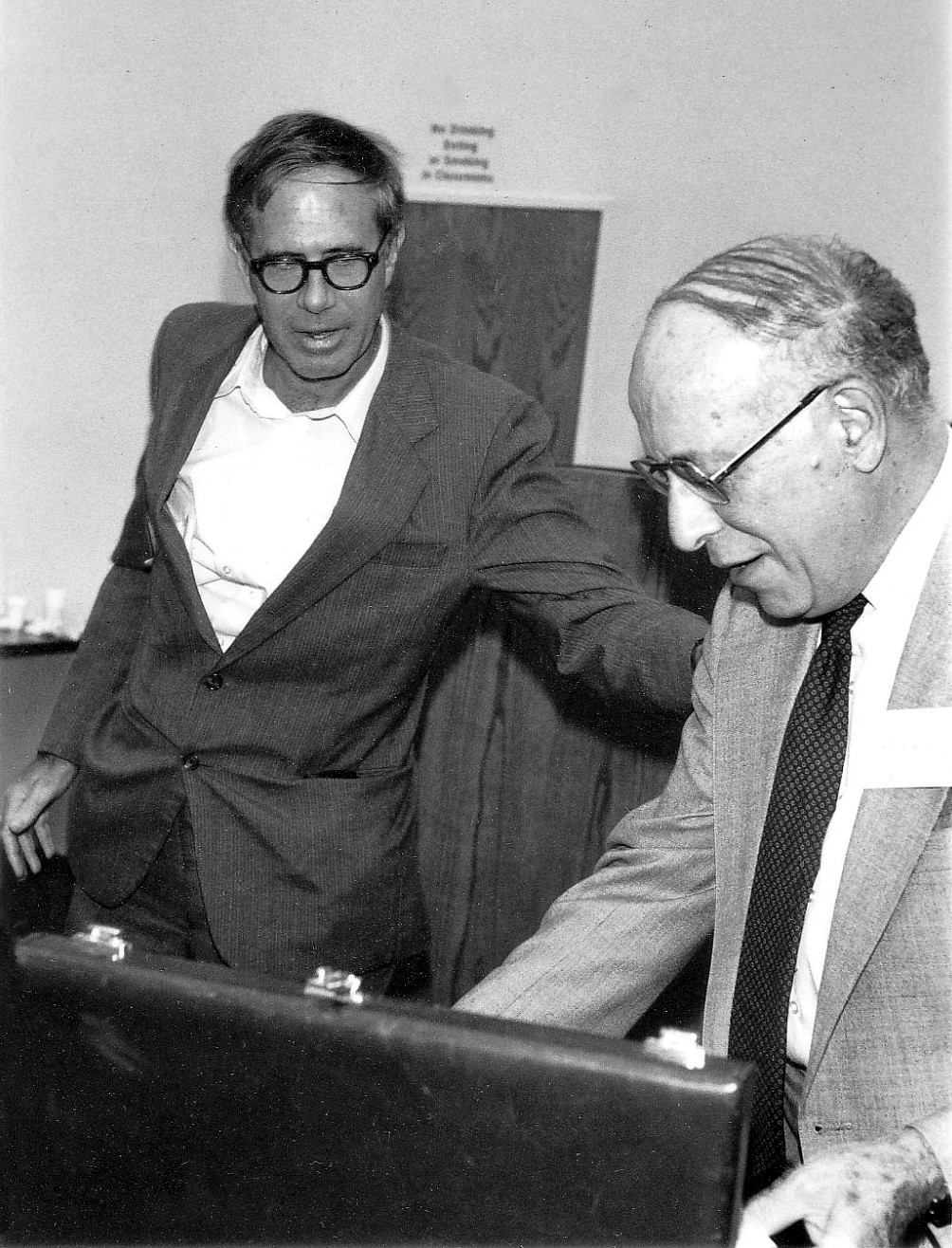
Moseley and Philip Klass at the 1983 CSICOP Conference in Buffalo, NY

=== 1970s ===
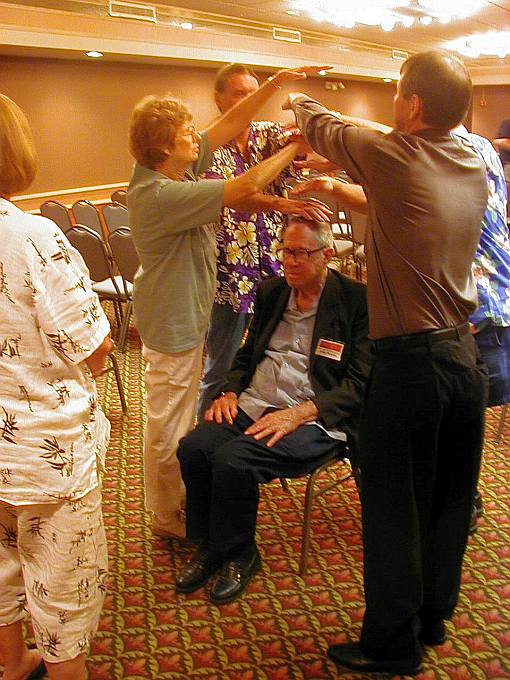
Moseley ready to be "levitated" at the National UFO Conference in Hollywood, California in 2004

Moseley sold Saucer News to his long-time friend Gray Barker in 1968. In 1970, he founded another newsletter that went by several titles until Moseley finally settled on Saucer Smear. He produced the newsletter irregularly, but tried to keep a monthly schedule in later years. It became the longest continuously published UFO journal in the world.

Moseley never went online; he never owned a computer. He produced the print version of "Saucer Smear" on a portable electric typewriter, tape and glue, and a photocopy machine. The publication was sent via mail to "non-subscribers," and he also authorized others to sell PDF issues and subscriptions from a website. It typically had a joking, gossipy tone and it covered not just UFO cases, but also examined the personalities of UFOlogists and it did not hesitate to poke fun at people if he thought they deserved it. When UFOlogists were feuding, as they often were, Moseley loved to run the vitriolic letters one would send in denouncing the other. The masthead on each issue proclaimed Moseley as the "Supreme Commander".

=== 1980s and later ===
In 1984, Moseley established an antiques store in Key West, Florida. There was a pre-Columbian art gallery, largely stocked with material he still had from his trips to South America in the 1950s. In 1992, Moseley donated his Peruvian collection to the Graves Museum of Archaeology and Natural History in Dania, Florida, where it is on permanent display.

Moseley co-wrote a memoir with Karl T. Pflock in 2002, entitled Shockingly Close to the Truth! Confessions of a Grave-Robbing Ufologist, in which he recounted “the fun he has had over the years pursuing tall tales and purported evidence of visitors from outer space.”

James Moseley died from cancer of the esophagus on November 16, 2012, at a hospital in Key West, Florida; he was 81 years old.

== UFO investigations and hoaxes ==
=== Exposé of George Adamski ===
George Adamski was a teacher of the occult, who wrote a book in 1953 entitled Flying Saucers Have Landed, which told the story of his encounter with an extraterrestrial named Orthon. The book made him a celebrity in flying saucer circles, and it inspired other people who became known as "contactees" to make similar claims. Adamski started to produce an abundance of apparent "evidence": multiple witnesses, physical traces, photographs and later he took movies of the saucer while he claimed to have ongoing contact with the visitors from space and share their message of peace and love with the people of Earth.

Moseley had interviewed Adamski in 1953, and while he found the “Professor” interesting and charismatic, he did not find the evidence convincing. He published several articles critically examining Adamski's stories and photographs in issues of Saucer News magazine, and in October 1957 he published a "Special Adamski Exposé Issue" that collected articles written by Moseley, Irma Baker and Lonzo Dove to present a thorough analysis. The front cover showed how a "saucer photo" just like Adamski's could be made using a Chrysler hubcap, a coffee can, and ping pong balls. Jerrold Baker told how Adamski had provided him with fraudulent photos and suggested that "people would pay good money" if Baker claimed the photos were his own. The exposé included interviews and correspondence with Adamski's supporting witnesses, some of whom said they had been mis-quoted, and others who turned out to be long-time associates of Adamski and who admitted that Adamski's story and photographs had been falsified.

This was a watershed in the UFO field; it marked the first really serious analytical investigation into the evidence supporting a major claim. More than forty years later, the UFO historian Jerome Clark said "...the first serious investigation by a critic of Adamski’s claims was conducted by James W. Moseley in the mid-1950s and published as a special issue of his magazine Saucer News ... Moseley’s debunking of Adamski’s claims remains the definitive one".

=== Straith hoax letter ===
Moseley was long suspected of having co-created a phony 1957 letter as a prank against self-claimed "alien contactee", George Adamski. After years of denying his involvement, evading the subject, and hinting at responsibility, Moseley admitted to the hoax in 1985.

Adamski had become well known following publication of his 1953 book Flying Saucers Have Landed, and subsequent paraphernalia "evidence". Moseley published a damning exposé in Saucer News magazine. Just as word of Adamski's fakery was spreading, a letter of support came from an unlikely source.

In 1957, Gray Barker acquired some blank U.S. Governmental official letterhead and envelopes from a friend – white-seal, blue-embossed paper, with the American eagle watermark and the Seal of State impressed. During an evening "emboldened by the evil of alcohol", Moseley and Barker wrote seven prank letters using this official stationery. Five of the letters were jokes to friends, and two were outright hoaxes: the Adamski letter and one to Moseley's own father, which was never mailed, that "objected to his having indulged in extreme right-wing political activities while on a military pension, strongly implying he might lose the latter if he did not refrain from the former”.

The letter to Adamski was signed by the fictional "R.E. Straith", a representative of the non-existent "Cultural Exchange Committee" of the U.S. State Department. Straith wrote that the government knew that Adamski had actually spoken to extraterrestrials in a California desert in 1952, and that the department also had its own evidence bearing out his claims. It encouraged him to continue his work of communicating his experiences to the public, since the government could not take an official position on the matter.

Adamski took great pride in the Straith letter. He publicized its contents, and UFO proponents all over the world used it to validate their claims. When FBI agents investigated it, they informed Adamski that the Straith letter was a hoax and asked him to stop using it as evidence in support of his claims, but Adamski refused and he continued to display the letter in his lectures and talks. FBI agents also questioned Barker about the matter, but no criminal charges were filed.

Many investigators tried to confirm or debunk the letter, without any categorical outcomes. Barker himself described it as "one of the great unsolved mysteries of the UFO field" in his 1967 Book of Adamski. As late as 1983, researchers Timothy Good and Lou Zinsstag concluded that "much of the evidence is circumstantial, but on balance there is more in favour of the letter being genuine."

On December 6, 1984, Gray Barker died. The next month, Jim Moseley revealed the truth in Saucer Smear on January 10, 1985. Moseley has admitted to multiple UFO "hoaxes", and is suspected in many more, but the Straith hoax appears to be the one most remembered by both his fans and his detractors.

=== Ralph Horton crash case ===
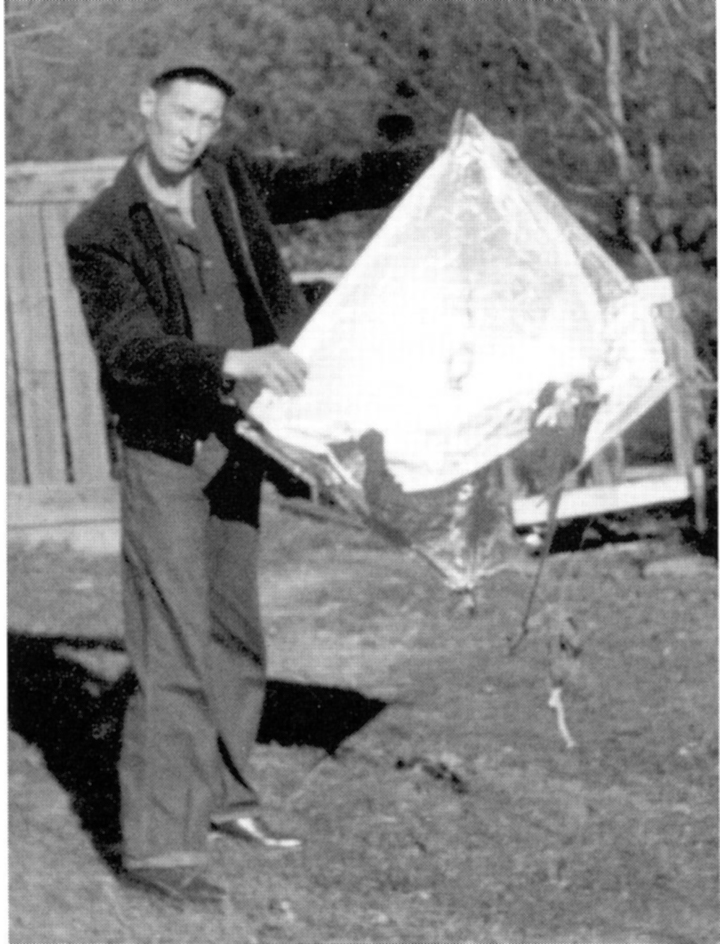
Horton and the "flying saucer"

Moseley investigated the Ralph Horton flying saucer crash after finding it in the flying saucer file of the Atlanta Constitution. Moseley called the airport and confirmed that the object was a device called a corner reflector, which was used by the Air Force to determine wind velocity and direction. The object was attached to a balloon and sent into the atmosphere to be tracked by radar, since radar beams were reflected by the object. Horton retrieved the object from where he had discarded it, and gave it to Moseley, but Moseley subsequently lost it. In later years, Moseley lamented that if he had held on to the object, then it might have been he instead of Pflock who cracked the Roswell incident.

=== Lost Creek saucer video ===
The Lost Creek Saucer sighting was a hoax brainstormed by Gray Barker and James Moseley in early 1966. The idea was to produce footage of a flying saucer. On July 26, 1966, in Lost Creek, West Virginia, they had John Sheets — one of Barker's researchers — hold a ceramic "boogie" saucer on a fishing pole in front of a car, while Moseley drove and Barker filmed.

Afterwards, Moseley played the film during his UFO lectures, and Barker sold copies of the footage via his mail-order film business. Both men continued to claim that Sheets had innocently recorded the saucer landing. In "Whispers from Space," the footage is shown while Moseley discusses its origins.

Moseley later wrote in his book "In addition to showing the film on New York–area television and at one of the Saucer News monthly lectures, I incorporated it and the story behind it into my American Program Bureau talk. I had decided I needed a 'prop' for my lectures", then describes how he, Barker and Sheets made it.
