= Jeff Rense =

American radio host and conspiracy theorist

- Born: Jeffry Shearer Rense
- Education: University of California, Santa Barbara
- Occupation: self employed podcaster
- Known for: Propagating conspiracy theories
- Website: rense.com

Jeffry Shearer Rense is an American Internet radio talk-show host. His show, the Jeff Rense Program, was broadcast via satellite radio and is now produced at his home in Ashland, Oregon, and streamed through his personal website.

Rense's podcast and website propagate conspiracy theories, including those of 9/11 conspiracists, ufologists and advocates of the paranormal, the creation of diseases, chemtrails, evidence of advanced ancient technology, emergent energy technologies, and alternative medicine.

Rense's writings and website have been deemed pro-Nazi and antisemitic by the Anti-Defamation League and the Southern Poverty Law Center.

== Radio host ==
Rense's first on-air experience came while he was a student at University of California, Santa Barbara in the 1970s.

In 1994, Rense self-financed a radio show on Santa Barbara's KTMS. The show was originally broadcast as Sightings on the Radio, the title being a direct reference to the television series Sightings. The show was originally distributed by Premiere Radio Networks but was dropped in the late 1990s after it was deemed hate speech and banned in Europe. Talk Radio Network then carried the show through the early 2000s, when all references to Sightings were dropped and the title Jeff Rense Program was adopted.

Genesis Communications Network took over distribution and carried the show through August 2009, when Rense accused fellow GCN host Alex Jones of threatening to "destroy" him. Jeff Rense Program is now streamed through Rense's personal website.

Guests on the show have included former Congresswoman Cynthia McKinney, host of The Political Cesspool, James Edwards, Brad Steiger, British conspiracy theorist David Icke, Texe Marrs, and David Duke.

== Criticism of antisemitic content ==
The Anti-Defamation League and the Southern Poverty Law Center have stated that Rense disseminates antisemitic and pro-Nazi speech while promoting people with similar ideologies.
