= Ground Crew Project =

UFO religion

- Formation: November 1996
- Founder: Sheldan Nidle
- Type: UFO religion
- Location: United States
- Chief administrator (1996–1997): Valerie Donner
- Affiliations: Planetary Activation Organization

The Ground Crew Project is a UFO religion based in the United States. It was founded in the 1980s by Sheldan Nidle, moved operations online in 1996, and later split into the "Ground Crew" and "Planetary Activation Organization". It has been described as an optimistic UFO religious group that believes the Earth is on the verge of a cosmic transformation. According to adherents, such a transformation was expected to happen as the Earth passed through the high energy properties of a "photon belt" in the 1990s. Members say the religion's aim is to prepare humanity for large-scale, first contact between Earth and the Galactic Federation, which they claimed is an extraterrestrial organization which will help in the supposed transformation. Members of the group are being prepared to play key roles as intermediaries between the claimed extraterrestrials and the population of Earth. Even after failed predictions, the group believes contact will happen "as soon as possible" and they must assist in 'raising' mankind beforehand.

== Sheldan Nidle ==
Sheldan Nidle claims he had extraterrestrial and UFO experiences shortly after his birth on November 11, 1946. Nidle claims he was contacted by extraterrestrials (ETs) from the planet Sirius, stating that his experiences consisted of such events as telepathic communication, being taught aboard spacecraft, and gaining knowledge from 'direct core implants'. In 1994 he published a book You're Becoming a Galactic Human in which he describes a boyhood encounter with extraterrestrials who landed in his backyard. Since 1955, he has claimed to be in regular communication with ETs through telepathy and 'direct core knowledge inserts'. However, he states that when he was 14 years old, he ended extraterrestrial communication because he was expected to fulfil his mission as a 'star seed from Sirius', and there was too much conflict between terrestrial and extraterrestrial knowledge. He then became vice-president of the Amateur Astronomers Club and worked on a film on Nikola Tesla.

He attended Ohio University and University of Southern California, graduating with an M.A. in Southeast Asian government and an M.A. in American politics and international public administration. After beginning a PhD program, he left this to research alternative energy sources. He claims he was contacted again in the mid-80s by extraterrestrial forces, namely the "Galactic Federation", whom he now represents as a lecturer.

=== Galactic Federation ===
The Galactic Federation is a supposed alliance of extraterrestrial civilizations within the Milky Way. This intergalactic council was allegedly revealed through a few well known people in their networks. It was through channeling that Nidle revealed his awareness. The idea that such a federation would exist is popular within UFO religions and certain New Age movements. This federation also appears in many science fiction stories.

== History ==
=== Photon belt ===
Beginning in November 1996, Nidle channeled a narrative that was an urgent call to humanity and involved an imminent apocalypse due to a planetary transformation of Earth. He claimed to be leading a mission on Earth for the "Galactic Federation of Planets" in order to prepare Earth for this coming transformation supposed to occur as the planet passes into the path of a cosmic 'photon belt', an area of outer space that he claimed had high energy properties similar to the plasma in the atmosphere of stars. His narrative stated that the photon belt would aid Earth's transformation into a pristine state and restore the superhuman abilities of humanity by gradually transforming human genetic codes from a double-helix DNA to a 12-helix DNA pattern. The "dormant" pineal gland would be activated and an immediate healing process would take place. It was expected that the human body, having lost certain cosmic capabilities in the past, would regain its galactic ability to rejuvenate itself, overcome illness and aging, and become telepathic.

The channeling claimed that human structures would be destroyed in the process of photon belt activation, and the only safe places would be underground or inside spaceships. According to the early channelings, only extraterrestrial intervention by the Galactic Federation could save most of humanity. Nidle channeled the narrative on at least a weekly basis, claiming that huge underground chambers were being drilled, and massive spaceships were being prepared to house humans who would join a deep space brotherhood.

=== Imminent landing ===
The narrative stated that during Earth's entry into the photon belt and no later than December 17, 1996, a mass landing of 15 million star ships of the "Galactic Federation" would complete the raising of the consciousness of humanity using their advanced technology. This would achieve a paradise of sociological and ecological evolution—a galactic and divine society—by 2012.

It was claimed the landing would represent hundreds of advanced races including Pleiadians, Sirians, Cassiopeans, and Arcturians, who will fan out across the globe to meet and placate human populations. "We are being assisted by all of Creation – the Spiritual Hierarchy, Angelic Realms, the Galactic Federation of Light, Ascended Masters, and our space brothers and sisters." Attractive accounts of the Earth transformation included the use of telepathy, airborne transport instead of cars, and special photon energy generators for domestic appliances.

This religious ufology belongs to the "cargoistic" genre, because the ascension of humans is believed to be brought about by superior alien "cargo"; in this case, comprising incredible new technologies and ecologically harmless energies.

=== Ground Crew ===
The "Ground Crew" refers to the virtual congregation who choose to join the mission. Members of the Ground Crew were told via the Internet that at the time of the landing they would be assisting humanity and the extraterrestrials as councilors and ambassadors, respectively. Space forces would initially use sophisticated technology to train the members while they slept, followed by the use of implants. Members were encouraged to recruit as many people as possible. Later, with the failure of predictions, the emphasis became more spiritual. This obliged the Ground Crew to play a salvific role before the landing could take place. They were asked to help raise humanity spiritually, and to assist in the ecological restoration of Mother Earth. In fact this was a "graduation exercise" for the crew. The membership must also participate in creating a 'network of light', expand the teachings, and link with similarly positioned New Age groups.

=== Landings delayed ===
The December 1996 mass landing failed to eventuate—but Nidle continued to spread 'messages' from the Galactic Federation that the spaceships would appear soon. Further identified but uneventful landing dates were the Gregorian New Year and the spring of 1997. Delays were blamed on a solar storm and the instability of the planet. Many attractive glimpses of life in the new cosmic environment continued to be channeled. In February 1997, amazing details about the comet Hale–Bopp were communicated, and in March 1997 the amount of spaceships in the landing fleet was increased to 25 million.

=== Comet Hale–Bopp ===
A new landing date was set to coincide with the arrival of the Hale–Bopp comet on 5 May 1997. According to the channeling, the comet was a large spaceship containing "cloaking and holographic systems that imitate what a comet should look like". It contained a crew of over 200,000 sentient beings and bore 10,000 ambassadors who would initiate humanity into the Galactic Federation. This would coincide with the mass landing by the Federation involving millions of ships. A special delegation would meet with the ambassadors.

After the mass suicide of Heaven's Gate members, Valerie Donner, a core member, distanced the Ground Crew from such "ridiculous acts of self-destruction". Two days before the scheduled event, Nidle posted that instead of a mass landing, a meeting between a shuttle from the comet and a shuttle from the "Galactic Federation Fleet" had taken place just south of Ayers Rock in Australia. A special ceremony had been conducted and vital papers had been exchanged. After May 10 there was no further mention of the comet or its occupants.

=== Further rescheduling and shift in focus ===
Nidle and the Ground Crew blamed repeated failed prophecies on various external factors. By June 1997, otherworldly and interstellar dark forces were said to have conspired with 'planetary elites' and held up the intentions of the Galactic Federation which had underestimated the situation, but could not be deterred. At the same time, messages began to deny the relevance of any specific arrival date and talked about "the right divine time".

The second half of 1997 heralded an important shift in focus as the messages began to require humans to assist the transformation of the planet in an interim period before any galactic intervention took place. Salvation became a two-way street. The channeling stated that the 'right divine time' may now be determined by the attitudes of humans.

=== Split ===
In December 1997 Nidle split with Valerie Donner, his secretary and the Ground Crew's chief administrator, for unclear reasons, as both parties posted alternative accounts of the schism. However, Donner appeared a rather "comic character" whose postings undermined the "more lofty, aesthetic standards of Nidle's prose". But she also took the rights to the Ground Crew name and website with her, forcing Nidle to start a new organization. Donner maintained the Ground Crew website, posting channeled messages with a UFO content which included the Galactic Federation. However, the website focused on personal spiritual transformation and presented more New Age elements such as angels, fairies, telepathy, and communing with plants.

Nidle then founded the Planetary Activation Organization and restructured this organization as the only source for messages about the Galactic Federation. It was set up as a hierarchical, bureaucratic system, and small Planetary Activation Groups were established. Nidle then began to create a "Web of Light" to unite similarly minded groups concerned with the environment, government conspiracies, and UFOs. New narratives emerged concerning the spiritual evolution of humanity and the role of Planetary Activation.

=== Narrative evolution ===
According to Nidle's channeling, the Federation remained "dedicated to massive first contact as soon as possible" but the spiritual transformation of the human being into the divine form was now the main focus. The Earth rulers were identified as a secret cabal who have negatively directed humanity for millennia, but would be slowly removed by the Federation. 'Star Gates' were being placed in the upper atmosphere to aid transformation, and special 'Galactic and Medical Teams' were assisting people when they slept.

The narrative now portrayed Earth as a vitally important planet in the universe due to the exalted role of humanity. It was a special 'showcase' that would act as a switch in the spiritual transformation of the Milky Way. Helland notes that the concept became so anthropocentric it included a special day count for humanity on the Earth, instituted by the galactic "Time Keepers".

Despite the failed prophecies, by the year 2000 the movement was continuing to develop its membership base and claiming to have hundreds of Planetary Activation Groups in over 29 countries.

The Planetary Activation Organization is classified as a progressive millennialist group because it promises that all of humanity may achieve collective salvation and the attainment of a terrestrial paradise.

== Credibility ==
Helland states that the Ground Crew resorted to "many of the classic strategies to avoid prophetic disconfirmation and [consequent] cognitive dissonance." For instance, he employs face-saving strategies such as "disclaimers", and "exploits the full gamut of the 'vocabulary of temporality'."

In general, Nidle has managed the failed prophecy by engaging in what J. Gordon Melton states is a reconceptualization through the process of spiritualisation: a UFO landing with advanced technology is changed into a need to raise humanity spiritually by humans themselves. In the case of the Ground Crew, Nidle "refashions his following from a passive audience of 'netheads' waiting to be 'zapped' by a superior alien technology into involved participants" who form committees of activists helping Mother Earth and humanity.

Helland states that due to the virtual nature of the group, and the lack of observable and empirical data, it is impossible to accurately account for the membership which may have declined drastically with the failed 1996–97 predictions. The group has, however, generated sufficient income to maintain its website and a core group of devotees. But earlier text can be altered or deleted. Helland observes that the movement's most notorious period of failed prophecy is no longer online, thus new members may never learn of it.

This online, millenarian narrative functions so like fiction that Palmer and Helland have devoted an article to a literary/aesthetic analysis of the religion rather than the normal sociological discussion. Following the literary critic Austin Wright, they explore the discourse as a literary art form. Virtual reality is the vehicle of the myth—which conveys "a vivid imaginary world [and] ... an intense mood of apocalyptic expectancy" for its participants. They also show how Nidle moves from the self-generated fictional world to the narrator-controlled fictional world as the prophecies fail. They also comment on the Internet's role on the instant inception, rapid evolution, and spectacular metamorphoses of online religions.

== See also ==
- Ancient astronauts
- Xenu

== Bibliography ==
- Daniels, Ted (1999). A Doomsday Reader: Prophets, Predictors, and Hucksters of Salvation. New York University Press. ISBN 0-8147-1909-0.
- Gruenschloss, Andreas (2003) [December 1998]. "»When we enter into my Father's spacecraft«: Cargoistic hopes and millenarian cosmologies in new religious UFO movements". In Lewis, James R. (ed.). Encyclopedic sourcebook of UFO religions. New York: Prometheus. Chapter 1, pp.17–42. ISBN 1-57392-964-6.
- Helland, Christopher (2000). "Ground Crew/Planetary Activation Organization". In Lewis, James R. (ed.). UFOs and popular culture: an encyclopedia of contemporary mythology. Santa Barbara: ABC-CLIO. pp. 140–142. ISBN 1-57607-265-7.
- Lamy, Philip (2000). "Planetary Activation Organization". In Landes, Richard (ed.). Encyclopedia of millennialism and millennial movements. New York: Routledge. pp. 560–561. ISBN 0-415-92246-1.
- Palmer, Susan and Christopher Helland (2003). "UFO religions online: prophetic failures and the narrative techniques of the Ground Crew". In Lewis, James R. (ed.). Encyclopedic sourcebook of UFO religions. New York: Prometheus. Chapter 17, pp.331–346. ISBN 1-57392-964-6.
- Trompf, Garry W. (2003). "UFO religions and cargo cults". In Partridge, Christopher (ed.). UFO religions. Routledge. Chapter 11, pp.221–238. ISBN 0-41526324-7.
- Tumminia, Diana (2007). Alien worlds: sacred and religious dimensions of extraterrestrial contact. Syracuse University Press. ISBN 978-0815608585.
- Wojcik, Daniel (2003). "Apocalyptic and millenarian science". In Partridge, Christopher (ed.). UFO religions. London: Routledge. Chapter 14, pp.274–300. ISBN 0-415-26324-7.
