= Cedric Allingham =

British hoaxer

Peter Davies as 'Cedric Allingham' posing with Patrick Moore's telescope. The only known portrait of the author, from Flying Saucer from Mars

Cedric Allingham (born June 27, 1922) is a fictional British writer reputed in the 1954 book Flying Saucer from Mars to have encountered the pilot of a Martian spacecraft. It was speculated that Allingham's account was fabricated and that Allingham himself never existed. Three decades later the elaborate hoax was revealed to have been perpetrated by British astronomer Patrick Moore and his friend Peter Davies.

== Autobiography ==
Allingham's book stated that he had been born in 1922 in Bombay, and educated in England and South Africa. He had taken up amateur astronomy while posted to the Middle East with the RAOC, and subsequently travelled around Britain indulging his hobbies of bird-watching and caravan holidays while making a living as a writer of thrillers.

== Claims ==
Allingham recounted that on 18 February 1954, while on holiday near Lossiemouth, he encountered a flying saucer and communicated with its pilot by means of hand gestures and telepathy. The spaceman had indicated that he came from Mars, and that he had also visited Venus and the Moon. As supporting evidence, Allingham took a number of blurry photographs of the saucer and one of its occupants, pictured from the rear. He also claimed that a fisherman named James Duncan had witnessed the event from a nearby hill, providing a signed statement that was reproduced in the book.

Coming soon after the dramatic claims of the contactee George Adamski, Allingham's book attracted a fair amount of popular and media attention. Time devoted a short piece to it early in 1955. Commenting that Allingham's photograph of a Martian looked "very like a crofter with galluses flapping", the writer added:

England's most eager astronauts, the slide-rule devotees of the British Interplanetary Society, hoot at the book's "scientific" label. Politely, they suggest that Author Allingham has a highly susceptible imagination or that somebody has elaborately hoaxed him. But Allingham, now undergoing lung treatment at a Swiss sanatorium, cares little if critics point out that saucer pictures have been faked in the past with lampshades, garbage-can covers and trapshooting targets tossed in the air. Such books as his apparently answer a deep and widespread yearning for marvels.

== Evasion ==
Members of the flying saucer clubs popular at the time made attempts to interview Allingham, but both he and James Duncan proved remarkably elusive. Allingham was said to have delivered a lecture to a UFO group in Tunbridge Wells, at which Lord Dowding (former Air Chief Marshal of the RAF during World War II and a prominent UFO believer) stated he was present: "We got Mr. Cedric Allingham ... to lecture to our local Flying Saucer Club, and we were all strongly impressed that he was telling the truth about his actual experiences, although we felt that he might have been mistaken in some of the conclusions which he drew from his interview". The writer Robert Chapman made several attempts to trace Duncan, and to contact Allingham through his publishers, who stated firstly that Allingham was undergoing medical treatment in Switzerland, and then that he had died there. Chapman was only able to confirm that Allingham had given the previously mentioned lecture in Sussex, at which the well-known broadcaster, astronomer and noted UFO skeptic Patrick Moore claimed to have met him. Unable to locate either Duncan or Allingham, and therefore suspecting some form of hoax, Chapman regretfully concluded that "if there was no James Duncan and [thus] no visitor from Mars, perhaps there was no Cedric Allingham either".

== Hoax revealed ==
The mystery was finally unravelled in 1986 as a result of research by Christopher Allan and Steuart Campbell which was published in the skeptical Fortean journal Magonia. In "Flying Saucer from Moore's?", they argued that the prose of Allingham's book showed significant similarities to the writing of the famous astronomer Patrick Moore. Thanks to further enquiries to Allingham's publisher, they were able to trace a friend of Moore named Peter Davies who admitted that he had written the book with another individual whom he declined to name. Davies also claimed that the talk at the UFO club given by "Allingham" had in fact been given by himself while wearing a false moustache. Moore had admitted to being invited by Lord Dowding to be a guest at this meeting. These and other clues led Allan and Campbell to identify Patrick Moore as the main culprit in the hoax, which was intended to expose the gullibility and uncritical research methods of British ufologists. Specifically Flying Saucer from Mars seems to parody Flying Saucers Have Landed, the 1953 book written by the aforementioned George Adamski in collaboration with Desmond Leslie.

Further articles on Moore's involvement appeared in The Star, July 28, 1986 and the 'Feedback' page of New Scientist, August 14, 1986.

Moore, however, immediately denied being responsible for Allingham's book, and threatened to take legal action against anyone suggesting otherwise, although he took no such action on any of the three articles mentioned above. Moore, who died in 2012, never confirmed his involvement in the affair, even though the telescope, background foliage and portion of shed shown in the book's portrait of Allingham bears a remarkable resemblance to the 12½-inch reflector telescope in Moore's own garden, as shown in a photograph in Moore's Observer Book of Astronomy, 1971 edition, and in film footage.

Possible sources for Allingham's biography are a "C. W. Allingham" who appears in the Army List for April 1945 in the RAC Royal Tank Regiment with the rank of temporary captain and a seniority of 19 April 1941 and Margery Allingham who was a detective fiction writer of the 1930s to 1960s.

== Sources ==
- Cedric Allingham at answers.com
- Clarke, D. and Roberts, A. Flying Saucerers: a Social History of Ufology, Alternative Albion, 2007, ISBN 978-1-905646-00-5
- Clarke, D. and Roberts, A. Out of the Shadows, Piatkus, 2002, ISBN 978-0-7499-2290-0
- Dewey, S. In Alien Heat, Anomalist, ISBN 978-1-933665-02-3
