= Nordic aliens =

Alleged humanoid extraterrestrials

Benevolent "space brothers" were depicted as strangely-attired European men of Nordic descent, both in 1952's supposedly-real-life alien named Orthon (top, as described by George Adamski and depicted by Gay Betts) and in the 2000 film Dude, Where's My Car?'s "Nordic Dudes" (played by Christian Middelthon and Dave Bannick) who are revealed to be benevolent aliens.

In ufology, Nordic aliens are one of several purported humanoid races hailing from the Pleiades star cluster (i.e., Pleiadians), their name originating from superficial reported similarities with "Nordic", Germanic, or Scandinavian humans. Alleged contactees describe Nordics as being taller than the average human, standing roughly 6–7 ft (1.8–2.1 m) in height (with an equally proportional weight), and showing stereotypically "European" or "White" features, such as long, straight blond hair, blue eyes, and fair skin.

In the 1950s, George Adamski, a Polish-American ufologist, was among the first to publicly report his alleged contact with Nordic beings. Scholars note that the mythology of extraterrestrial visitations from such beings (with physical features superficially described as "Aryan") often make mention of telepathy, benevolence, and physical beauty and grace. Many other purported extraterrestrial encounters also involve telepathy with human beings.

== History ==
Cultural historian David J. Skal wrote that early stories of Nordic-type aliens may have been partially inspired by the 1951 film The Day the Earth Stood Still, in which an extraterrestrial arrives on Earth to warn humanity about the dangers of atomic weapons. Bates College professor Stephanie Kelley-Romano described alien abduction beliefs as "a living myth", and notes that, among believers, Nordic aliens "are often associated with spiritual growth and love and act as protectors for the experiencers."

In contactee and ufology literature, Nordic aliens are often described as benevolent or even "magical" beings who want to observe and communicate with humans and are concerned about the Earth's ecology or prospects for world peace. Believers also ascribe telepathic powers to Nordic aliens, and describe them as "paternal, watchful, smiling, affectionate, and youthful".

During the 1950s, many people alleging to be contactees, especially those in Europe, claimed encounters with beings fitting this description. Such claims became relatively less common in subsequent decades, as the grey alien supplanted the Nordic in most alleged accounts of extraterrestrial encounters.

== Accounts ==
Books claiming personal contact with Nordic aliens include George Adamski's Flying Saucers Have Landed and Inside the Space Ships, Howard Menger's From Outer Space to You, Travis Walton's The Walton Experience and Charles James Hall's Millennial Hospitality (film adapted as Walking with the Tall Whites (2020).

In 1952, UFO contactee George Van Tassel claimed to be in telepathic contact with Ashtar Sheran, a benevolent Nordic alien. Other mediums began to claim contact. At one point, dozens of people were claiming contact with Ashtar and presenting conflicting messages.

Followers of the UFO religion Universe People have reported a variety of interactions, some of them being published as "Talks with Teachings from my Cosmic Friends". Since 1975, UFO figure Billy Meier claimed contact with benevolent beings from the Pleiades star cluster.

== "Nordics" as blue-skinned ==
External image
- UFOs: Past, Present, and Future's 1974 depiction of blue-skinned saucer occupants

Later legends and popular culture sometimes depicted benevolent aliens as bluish in color, rather than blonde-haired, blue-eyed, and light-skinned. The 1974 documentary UFOs: Past, Present, and Future describes a supposed landing at Hollomon Air Force base where disc occupants with "an odd blue-grey complexion, eyes set far apart, a large pronounced nose, [who] wear a headpiece that resembles a ropelike design." The film featured artist's impressions of the blue aliens as they meet Air Force officers. In the 1970s, filmmaker James Cameron's mother relayed a dream of a blue-skinned being; Cameron penned an unpublished script based on the image in 1976. Cameron revisited the idea in his 2009 film Avatar, which centered around benevolent, beautiful, blue-skinned aliens. By the late 1990s, Internet lore described some "good guy" aliens as having light blue skin.

== See also ==
- Arcturians (New Age)
- Elizabeth Klarer
- Humanoid aliens
- Linda Moulton Howe
- List of alleged extraterrestrial beings
- Space Brothers
- Star people (New Age)
- Truman Bethurum
- UFO religion
