= Edward Daniels (disambiguation) =

Edward Daniels (1828–1916) was a geologist and academic.

Edward Daniels may also refer to:

- Edward "Teddy" Daniels, a character in the 2010 American film Shutter Island
- Ed Daniels, in 2004–05 NCAA Division I men's basketball season
- Eddie Daniels (born 1941), American musician
- Eddie Daniels (political activist) (born 1928), South African anti-apartheid activist

== See also ==
- Paul Daniels (1938–2016, born Newton Edward Daniels), English magician
- Ted Daniels (disambiguation)
