= Arcturians (New Age) =

Purported extraterrestrial civilisation

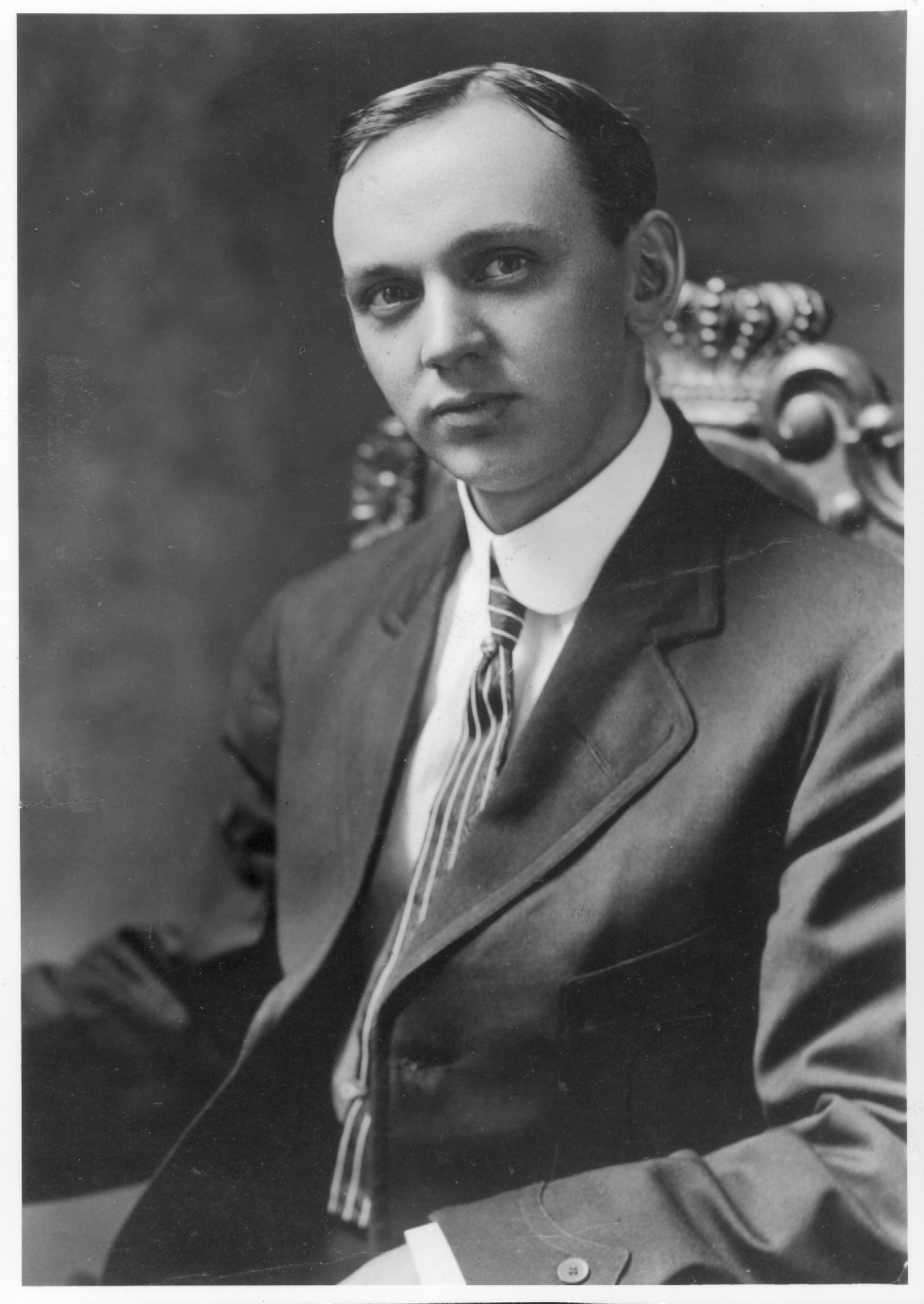
Edgar Cayce originated stories about Arcturians in 1928

Arcturians, a supposed extraterrestrial civilization from the red star Arcturus, first came to prominence after being mentioned in 1928 by American mystic Edgar Cayce. The concept was incorporated into many New Age movements, which imagine the Arcturians as benevolent beings seeking to share knowledge and wisdom with Earthlings. They would be an advanced society with a high level of spiritual awareness and technological sophistication.

== History ==
In 1920, Scottish writer David Lindsay published the science-fiction novel A Voyage to Arcturus. By 1923, the "Arcturians" were discussed as a hypothetical example in the writings of British spiritualist Francis Younghusband.

By 1928, Arcturus had become part of the teachings of Edgar Cayce, an American psychic. The star Arcturus was mentioned by Cayce in more than 30 of his psychic readings. He described Arcturus as a "gateway" to higher realms of consciousness that can have a profound effect on people's lives. Cayce called the Arcturians the most advanced community in the universe, the community most similar to the divine.

The concept of Arcturians was incorporated into the works of New Age leaders Jasmuheen and Dolores Cannon.

== See also ==
- Ancient astronauts – Pseudoscientific claims of past alien contact
- Galactic Federation (disambiguation)#Ufology
- Ground Crew Project – UFO religion
- Nordic aliens – Alleged humanoid extraterrestrials

== Additional reading ==
- Edgar Cayce (1971). Arcturus: A compilation of Extracts from the Edgar Cayce Readings. Edgar Cayce Foundation. Archived from the original on 2023-04-16.
