= Dolores Cannon =

American hypnotherapist and author (1931–2014)

- Born: Dolores Eilene Taylor; April 15, 1931; St. Louis, Missouri, U.S.
- Died: October 18, 2014 (aged 83); Fayetteville, Arkansas, U.S.
- Occupations: Author, hypnotherapist, publisher
- Known for: Past life regression hypnosis

Dolores Eilene Taylor Cannon (April 15, 1931 – October 18, 2014) was an American author, self-trained hypnotherapist, and publisher. She was a leader of the New Age movement and a promoter of fringe theories relating to aliens and alternative realities.

Cannon specialized in past life regression and developed a technique that she called the Quantum Healing Hypnosis Technique. She gained notoriety for claiming to be in contact with Nostradamus through her hypnosis sessions.

In 1992, Cannon founded Ozark Mountain Publishing which specializes in New Age, spirituality, and metaphysical books.

== Early life ==
Dolores Eilene Taylor was born in St. Louis, Missouri on April 15, 1931. Her parents were Mary Elizabeth (née Hardin) and Arthur Taylor. She completed her education in 1947 when she was sixteen years old.

== Career ==
=== Hypnotherapy ===
In the 1960s, Cannon began using hypnotherapy to control her weight and to stop smoking. She learned hypnosis from her husband who was an amateur hypnotist. While her husband was stationed in a Navy base in Texas in 1969, a doctor asked the couple to use hypnosis to help a patient who had an eating disorder. Under hypnosis, the patient began claiming they were a flapper in Chicago in the 1920s during a previous life. In the following months, the Cannons continued hypnosis, and the patient claimed and detailed a further four past lives. However, her work was stalled when her husband was injured in a car accident later that year.

In the late 1970s, Cannon returned to hypnotherapy and used it to treat clients. After past life regression sessions with thousands of clients, she created her own techniques and theories about reincarnation. She created what she called the Quantum Healing Hypnosis Technique (QHHT) which she believed allowed her to communicate with the client's subconscious. She claimed that her QHHT could heal any medical conditions by connecting the hypnotized person with a "different plane of consciousness". However, philosopher and academic Robert Todd Carroll notes that Cannon lacked medical training, was self-taught in hypnotherapy, and used the word quantum for her technique although "there is nothing quantum about it".

In 1985, Cannon became interested in UFOs and extraterrestrial investigations. She used her hypnosis techniques with individuals who claimed they had been abducted by aliens. Her findings from these sessions led to several books on extraterrestrials . Cannon was also the head of the Ozark Mountain UFO Conference from 2013 until 2014. Carroll believed that Cannon "cashed in" on the UFO and alien visitation fad and created "a bizarre cosmology on par with L. Ron Hubbard's story of Xenu".

=== Writer ===
Cannon wrote general articles for newspapers and magazines. She worked as a stringer for the Northwest Arkansas Times for ten years. However, because of the fringe nature of her hypnotherapy work, Cannon was unable to find a publisher for her research in the 1970s and 1980s. It took nine years for her to find a publisher for her first book. In 1992, she formed Ozark Mountain Publishing which published the works of Cannon and others who wrote about New Age subject matter.

Her first published book was the three-volume Conversations with Nostradamus which contained the translation of almost 1,000 prophecies that she claimed to have obtained during past life regression sessions and "direct psychic contact" with Nostradamus. This book was reviewed in The New York Times and The Washington Post. Alex Heard, reviewer for the Post, described Cannon as a millennialist who "views current events through blood-colored glasses". Cannon also wrote about a past-life regression hypnosis client whom she claimed had interacted with Jesus.

Cannon published a total of seventeen books covering New Age topics such as extraterrestrial worlds, lost civilizations, parallel universes, spiritual awareness, and mysteries such as the Bermuda Triangle, the Loch Ness Monster, and Stonehenge. Some of her books were about her work helping people recover their past lives; she claimed to have taken some clients back to lives on planets other than Earth. She also wrote about how her Quantum Healing Hypnosis Technique could cure AIDS, cancer, diabetes, flesh wounds, heart conditions, kidney diseases, vision issues, and other medical conditions.

Her books were translated into more than twenty languages and were international hits, especially in Russia and Eastern Europe. In reviewing one of Cannon's books, The Stirling Review noted that opinions on her work will range from controversial to "dangerous nonsense".

=== Speaker and teacher ===
Cannon was a frequent speaker for New Age conferences. She spoke at the Global Sciences Congress in Denver, Colorado in August 1991. In November 1991, she spoke at the world's largest holistic exposition, the New Age Whole Life Expo in Los Angeles, California. In December 1991, the Japanese television network TVW interviewed Cannon for a documentary special; she was interviewed because of her books on Nostradamus.

In 1992, she was interviewed for the CBS television show Doorways to the Unknown. Also in 1992, she toured Israel, England, and Europe where she presented lectures in conjunction with the release of her book Jesus and the Essenes. She spoke at the Ozark UFO Conference in 1997.

She also established the Quantum Healing Hypnosis Academy which taught students from around the world in person and through books and recordings.

== Personal life ==
In 1951, she married Johnny Cannon of Kansas City, Missouri, a member of the United States Navy. Their children included son Tom and daughters Gloria, Julia, and Nancy. Over 21 years, the family moved frequently for her husband's Naval assignments, sometimes to international locations. He served in the Korean War and the Vietnam War.

Her husband was nearly killed in a car accident in 1969 and used a wheelchair as a partial amputee the rest of his life. The family moved to Madison County, Arkansas, and lived off of his military pension. He died on April 30, 1994.

Cannon was a member and president of the Auxiliary of Veterans of Foreign Wars Post #2956 in Springdale, Arkansas.

Cannon died at the Washington Regional Medical Center in Fayetteville, Arkansas, on October 18, 2014. She was cremated at Brashears Funeral Home in Huntsville, Arkansas.

== Legacy ==
Cannon became "a central figure in conspiracy theory communities" and spread her beliefs in books and presentations about alien contact, Atlantis, alternative realities, reincarnation, and the concept of starseeds or individuals from other star systems who occupy human bodies on Earth. Author Ashwin Vinoo says that Cannon's work on aliens "led to propaganda" and created a narrative that "was implanted into the UFO community..." In The Skeptics Dictionary, Robert Todd Carroll wrote that Cannon was "the poster child" for the New Age movement but was undecided as to "whether Dolores Cannon was a charlatan, a fraud, or a sincere delusional person...."

The QHHT training she provided in person and through books and tapes informed the practices of hundreds of modern-day hypnotherapists, past life regressionists, and astrologers from around the world. The Quantum Healing Hypnosis Academy and Ozark Mountain Publishing that were founded by Cannon still exist today; her daughter, Julia Cannon, is the CEO of the former and director of the latter, where she teaches her mother's techniques to students from around the world. As of 2023, Ozark Mountain Publishing has released books by more than fifty authors on New Age topics such as metaphysics, UFOs, spirituality, alternative healing, reincarnation, and ancient history.

== Selected works ==
Book	Location of publication	Publisher	Year	ISBN	References
Conversations With Nostradamus: His Prophecies Explained, vol. 1	Boulder	American West Publishers	1989	978–1886940000	
Jesus and the Essenes: Fresh Insights into Christ's Ministry and the Dead Sea Scrolls. (The Life and Times of Jesus #1)	Bath	Gateway Books	1992	ISBN 0946551928	
A Soul Remembers Hiroshima	Huntsville	Ozark Mountain Publishing	1993	ISBN 0963277669	
Keepers of the Garden	Huntsville	Ozark Mountain Publishing	1993	ISBN 0963277642	
Between Death & Life: Conversations with a Spirit	Huntsville	Ozark Mountain Publishing	1993	ISBN 0963277650	
They Walked With Jesus: Past Life Experience With Christ. (The Life and Times of Jesus #2)	Bath	Gateway Books	1994	ISBN 1858600073	
Legend of Starcrash	Huntsville	Ozark Mountain Publishing	1994	ISBN 0963277677	
Legacy From the Stars	Huntsville	Ozark Mountain Publishing	1996	ISBN 0963277693	
Custodians: Beyond Abduction	Huntsville	Ozark Mountain Publishing	1998	ISBN 1886940045	
The Convoluted Universe Book 1	Huntsville	Ozark Mountain Publishing	2001	ISBN 1886940827	
The Convoluted Universe Book Two	Huntsville	Ozark Mountain Publishing	2005	ISBN 1886940045	
The Convoluted Universe Book Three	Huntsville	Ozark Mountain Publishing	2008	ISBN 1886940797	
Five Lives Remembered	Huntsville	Ozark Mountain Publishing	2009	ISBN 1886940649	
The Convoluted Universe Book Four	Huntsville	Ozark Mountain Publishing	2011	ISBN 1886940215	
The Three Waves of Volunteers and the New Earth	Huntsville	Ozark Mountain Publishing	2011	ISBN 1886940150	
The Search for Hidden, Sacred Knowledge	Huntsville	Ozark Mountain Publishing	2014	ISBN 1940265231	
The Convoluted Universe Book Five	Huntsville	Ozark Mountain Publishing	2015	ISBN 1940265290	
Horns of the Goddess	Huntsville	Ozark Mountain Publishing	2023	978-1956945218	

== See also ==
- Alien abduction
- Hypnotic induction
- Past life regression
- Reincarnation
