= Brad Steiger =

American writer (1936–2018)

- Born: Eugene E. Olson; February 19, 1936; Fort Dodge, Iowa, US
- Died: May 6, 2018 (aged 82); Mason City, Iowa, US
- Education: Luther College (Iowa); University of Iowa
- Occupation: Writer
- Spouse: Sherry Hansen Steiger (m. 1987)
- Writing career
- Years active: 1956–2018
- Genre: Paranormal

Brad Steiger (February 19, 1936 – May 6, 2018) was an American writer of fiction and non-fiction works on the paranormal, spirituality, UFOs, true crime and biographies. His books sold well to the public but were widely criticized by academics and skeptics for making far-fetched claims without scientific evidence.

== Biography ==
Steiger was born as Eugene E. Olson on February 19, 1936, at the Fort Dodge Lutheran Hospital during a blizzard. He grew up on a farm in Bode, Iowa. Steiger stated that his religious beliefs changed from Lutheran following a near-death experience that he claimed occurred when he was eleven years old. He also stated that parents encouraged him to become a teacher. He graduated from Luther College (Iowa) in 1957 and the University of Iowa in 1963. He taught high school English before teaching Literature and Creative Writing at his former college from 1963 to 1967.

Steiger claimed to have written his first book at age seven. His first book, Ghosts, Ghouls and Other Peculiar People, was published in 1965. He became a full-time writer by 1967. He authored/co-authored almost 170 books, which have sold 17 million copies. He wrote biographies on Greta Garbo, Judy Garland, and Rudolph Valentino, the latter of which was adapted as a film in 1977. With his wife Sherry Hansen Steiger, he was the author of Four-legged Miracles: Heartwarming Tales of Lost Dogs' Journeys Home.

Steiger appeared as a radio guest on Coast to Coast AM and the Jeff Rense Program.

Steiger wrote that he believed Atlantis was a real place. In his book Atlantis Rising he argued that Atlantis was the home of an all-powerful civilization with sophisticated technological achievement. He also declared his book Worlds Before Our Own, that the tracks at Paluxy River to be evidence for an ancient civilization of giant humans.

He was a proponent of the ancient astronauts idea. Steiger stated that many humans descend from alien beings. He referred to these beings as "star people".

== Personal life ==
Steiger was married to Sherry Hansen Steiger, an author and minister, from 1987 to his death in 2018. They have five children and nine grandchildren. He died on May 6, 2018, at the age of 82.

== Reception ==
Steiger's books on UFOs, spirituality, and the paranormal have generally sold well, but have been criticized by many academics for spurious content, lack of scientific evidence, and failure to cite sources, among other reasons.

Anthropologist Bonita Freeman-Witthoft gave Steiger's Medicine Power an entirely negative review. She noted that Steiger failed to cite scholarly sources, gave faulty documentation and his reporting of mythology was inaccurate. She concluded that "It is a disappointing work of no use to scholars and of little use to a person sincerely interested in American Indian spirituality."

Sarah Higley gave Steiger's The Werewolf Book a mixed review and concluded "with a definite penchant for the sensational at the expense of the accurate, the casual reader will find much in it informative and entertaining as well."

Skeptical investigator Joe Nickell considers Steiger an unreliable source and has noted that he "endlessly cranks out books promoting paranormal claims".

His books have also drawn criticism from Jason Colavito who has stated they are filled with pseudoscientific claims.

== Bibliography ==
- Indigenous American Medicine Power (1997)
- The Werewolf Book: The Encyclopedia of Shape-Shifting Beings (1999)
- Steiger, Brad; Steiger, Sherry (2006). Conspiracies and Secret Societies: The Complete Dossier. Canton Township: Visible Ink Press. ISBN 978-1-57859-174-9.
- Real Encounters, Different Dimensions, and Otherworldy Beings (2014) with his wife
