= Truman Bethurum =

American contactee (1898–1969)

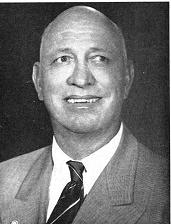
- Truman Bethurum c. 1954
- Born: August 21, 1898; Gavalin, California, U.S.
- Died: May 21, 1969 (aged 70); Landers, California, U.S.
- Known for: Alleged contact with extraterrestrials

Truman Bethurum (August 21, 1898 – May 21, 1969) was one of the well known UFO or alien contactees who gained notoriety during the 1950s. He was best known for his 1954 book Aboard a Flying Saucer, and founded the Sanctuary of Thought.

== Background ==
Bethurum was born on August 21, 1898, in Gavalin, California. He had little formal education and largely undertook blue-collar work.

== Claims ==
Bethurum claimed that one night, July 28 1952, while he was doing roadwork in the Mojave Desert in Nevada, he fell asleep and was contacted by aliens. The aliens, of "Latin" appearance, woke him up and transported him into a flying saucer called The Admiral's Scow. There he met the ship's captain, a beautiful woman named Aura Rhanes. He claimed he was then contacted several times.

Bethurum claimed that the flying saucer and its crew came from the planet Clarion. Clarion was allegedly located on the other side of the Moon, and thus could not be viewed from the Earth, which is why it was otherwise unknown to mankind. The planet was a utopia, with no war, disease, or traffic. Clarions worship a supreme god. They were said to resemble the Space Brothers. According to his narrative, the aliens came to represent other aliens that were worried about humanity's nuclear weapons. His claims followed the ones of George Adamski, also a contactee. Bethurum first told this story at a UFO convention in Giant Rock later that year, where he was a regular. He also regularly attended many other contactee conventions. The next year in 1953, a shortened version of this story was published in the UFO magazine Saucers.

Bethurum's 1954 book Aboard a Flying Saucer covered his experiences. That year he also spoke at the Giant Rock UFO convention with other contactees. Following the publication of Aboard a Flying Saucer, Bethurum became a celebrity among UFO and flying saucer buffs, and gained many followers. Other UFO researchers and investigators mostly dismissed Bethurum, largely due to his implausible claims. He was supported by George Adamski, who he had visited in 1953. The editor of the UFO publication Saucer News, James W. Moseley, believed him a liar. The claim about the additional planet was obviously impossible and so resulted in much criticism from others, including ufologists. He refused to undergo polygraph tests and refused to submit for analysis a paper that had supposedly originated on Clarion. An early outside chronicle of the contactee movement, the 1957 book Flying Saucer Pilgrimage, believed that Bethurum was completely sincere in his beliefs; they wrote that they were "favorably and very deeply impressed with Mr. Bethurum's unimaginative sincerity".

== Sanctuary of Thought and later writings ==
In 1955, Bethurum claimed that Rhanes told him to begin seeking donations to establish a Communal organization called the Sanctuary of Thought, which was based in Prescott, Arizona.

Some of Bethurum's later books include The Voice of the Planet Clarion (1957), Facing Reality (1958), and The People of the Planet Clarion (1970), published the year after his death.

Bethurum remarked that his first wife, Mary, divorced him, citing jealousy over Aura Rhanes. His wife, who was also a believer, accused him of cheating on her by having a sexual relationship with the alien. According to an artist who worked with him, Columba Krebs, Bethurum hired a secretary who supposedly resembled Rhanes. In 1960, Bethurum married his third wife, Alvira, their wedding taking place at the annual Giant Rock Spacecraft Convention.

The contactee Dorothy Martin also claimed to commune with aliens from Clarion, taking this from Bethurum, but had a different conception of it as an ethereal planet, not a physical one.

== Death and legacy ==
Bethurum died on May 21, 1969, in Landers, California. The Sanctuary of Thought died with him, having failed to develop into a full religion. Gregory L. Reese noted that, unlike some other contactees, he had not successfully reinterpreted his contactee experiences into a religious group.

J. Gordon Melton noted him as "one of the original flying saucer contactees of the 1950s"; he noted his account of Clarion as "crude".

== Bibliography ==
- Aboard a Flying Saucer. Los Angeles: DeVorss & Co., 1954.
- The Voice of the Planet Clarion
- Facing Reality
- The People of the Planet Clarion
- Messages from the People of the Planet Clarion. New Brunswick, NJ: Inner Light Publications, 1995. ISBN 0-938294-55-5.
