= A Doomsday Reader =

1999 book by Ted Daniels

- Cover of the first edition
- Editor: Ted Daniels
- Language: English
- Subject: Millenarianism and apocalypticism
- Publisher: New York University Press
- Publication date: 1999
- Publication place: United States
- Media type: Print (hardcover and paperback)
- Pages: 253
- ISBN: 0-8147-1908-2
- OCLC: 41387511
- Dewey Decimal: 301
- LC Class: HM866 .D66 1999

A Doomsday Reader: Prophets, Predictors, and Hucksters of Salvation is a 1999 anthology volume of texts related to millenarianism and apocalypticism, edited by Ted Daniels. Most of the content of the book is Daniels's analysis of the texts and related ideas, rather than the texts themselves. The book was first published by New York University Press in 1999 in paperback and hardcover editions. The editor Ted Daniels is a folklorist and scholar of millennialism, and was then the head of the one-man Millennium Watch Institute.

In an introduction and first chapter, Daniels discusses millenarian and apocalyptic ideas and their manifestation in several world religions. For the next 11 chapters, the book is split into three sections: "Enlightenment and Secular Millenarianism", "Millennial Evil", and "Well-Known Contemporary Movements", which each cover different types of millenarian texts. The first section focuses on secular apocalypses, while the second focuses on the presence of conspiracy in millennialism. The third and final section includes several documents from millenarian new religious movements, like the Branch Davidians, the Order of the Solar Temple, Aum Shinrikyo, and Heaven's Gate. A Doomsday Reader received largely positive reviews from critics, with praise for its timeliness, its selection of some more obscure texts, and Daniels's analysis.

== Background and publication history ==
The book was edited by Ted Daniels (born 1939). Daniels is a folklorist and scholar of millennialism. He has a PhD in folklore studies from the University of Pennsylvania. He began collecting information about doomsday claims in 1986. The Los Angeles Times dubbed him "Doomsday Man" due to his fascination with the apocalypse. He published Millennialism: An International Bibliography in 1992.

Daniels is the founder and head of the Philadelphia-based think tank the Millennium Watch Institute. The Millennium Watch Institute was an effort of Daniels alone; he set it up due to concern he had over how many people would be predicting the end of the world come the year 2000. It put out the Millennial Prophecy Report, of which Daniels was the editor and publisher, and was the center of his effort to archive apocalyptic material. Its collection was housed at the University of Pennsylvania.

A Doomsday Reader was first published by New York University Press in hardcover and paperback format in 1999. The first edition was 253 pages long. Its publication came shortly before the second millennium was to start, when some people predicted the apocalypse would occur. Daniels did not believe this. This also followed a series of high-profile conflicts involving millennialist religious movements that led to the deaths of several.

== Contents ==
In an introduction, Daniels discusses the ideas that drive apocalyptic and millennialist groups and people; he also says that contrary to expectation, the year 2000 may be a step forward in terms of world peace. Daniels argues that while millenarianism is religious in nature, its consequences are often political; he says that the book will make available otherwise obscure millenarian claims to a wider audience. In the book's introduction, he examines the presence of such ideas in mainstream world religions and the basic ideas of apocalypticism and millenarianism, including in Islam, Hinduism, Buddhism, Christianity, and Judaism, among others. Daniels defines a millennialist group as one that has a definitive political objective of a perfect world, which they wish to make reality.

Following the first chapter from Daniels, the next 11 chapters each contain a text from a relevant millennialist author or group. Some groups are secular millennialist, while others focus on cults and apocalyptic groups. Each text is preceded by an essay that explains the content and context of the text surveyed. Most of the text is Daniels's analysis, with only 50 of 253 pages in the paperback edition being made up of the primary sources. Some texts in the volume were not available publicly prior to A Doomsday Reader's publication. Texts are generally selected from the end of the 20th century. The texts are split into three sections. The first section is "Enlightenment and Secular Millenarianism", which discusses secular manifestations of apocalypticism from the writings of Karl Marx, Adolf Hitler, and the environmental movement. The second section is "Millennial Evil", which includes selections incorporating conspiratorial thought. The third and final section is "Well-Known Contemporary Movements", which documents several controversial new religious movements. In an epilogue, "The End", Daniels discusses again the new religions profiled in the last section and how millennialism can be connected to religious crimes and suicide. A bibliography is included with 166 entries.

Chapter list
Section	No.	Chapter title	Work title	Author(s)	Details
—N/a	1	"Millennialism in World Religions"	—N/a	Ted Daniels	Daniels defines millennialist concepts and examines millennialist ideas present in mainstream world religions.
Enlightenment and Secular Millenarianism	2	"Marxism"	The Communist Manifesto	Karl Marx and Friedrich Engels	The first chapter from The Communist Manifesto, a communist political pamphlet. Daniels argues it is apocalyptic in nature, reassuring believers and "foretell[ing] the perfection of the world in a cataclysmic overthrow of the existing order", and that when this had failed to arrive, "apologetic texts appeared accounting for this failure in terms familiar from religious contexts".
Enlightenment and Secular Millenarianism	3	"Nazism: Adolf Hitler and Mein Kampf"	Mein Kampf	Adolf Hitler	A chapter from Hitler's autobiography; Daniels recounts claimed influences on and analyzes his views. The passage selected "reflects the character of his rhetoric and the millenarian nature of his aims: to achieve a new order".
Enlightenment and Secular Millenarianism	4	"Environmentalism, Politics, and Progress"	"World Scientists' Warning to Humanity"	Henry Way Kendall	A document from the Union of Concerned Scientists that called for a radical change in the way of humanity's living due to environmental concerns.
Millennial Evil	5	"A Royalist Apocalypse: The Protocols of the Learned Elders of Zion"	The Protocols of the Learned Elders of Zion	Unknown	Daniels goes over the history of the document, an antisemitic hoax that claims a worldwide Jewish conspiracy, beginning with its composition in Russia and then its spread internationally.
Millennial Evil	6	"Myths of Power: Conspiracies, Revenge, and The Turner Diaries"	The Turner Diaries	William Luther Pierce	A neo-Nazi novel about an apocalyptic race war; part of the first chapter of the book is included. Daniels analyses power and conspiracy theories.
Millennial Evil	7	"The New World Order"	"Mission Statement of the Council on Foreign Relations"	Council on Foreign Relations	Many conspiracy theorists tie the CFR to the Illuminati and the New World Order conspiracy theory. Daniels describes their mission statement as a "modest apocalypse on which so much fear and fantasy build".
Well-Known Contemporary Movements	8	"The Branch Davidians"	"Chapter 1: The First Seal"	David Koresh	The final statement of David Koresh, the leader of the Branch Davidians, before he was killed during the Waco siege with several dozen of his followers. He planned to write one chapter for each of the seven seals described in the Book of Revelation, but was killed before they could be completed.
Well-Known Contemporary Movements	9	"The Order of the Solar Temple"	"Final Message to All Those Who Can Still Understand the Voice of Wisdom"	Order of the Solar Temple	One of the final documents from the Solar Temple, written to justify their 1994 mass murder–suicide. They were mailed to several figures, including scholar Jean-François Mayer, under the pseudonym "D. Part". Daniels's own translation from the French original.
Well-Known Contemporary Movements	10	"Aum Shinri Kyo and the Politics of Terror"	"The World after the Final War (The Millennium)"	Aum Shinrikyo	A partial transcript of a December 4, 1994 radio broadcast of a show entitled Evangelion tes Basileis from Aum Shinrikyo, a syncretic Buddhist group which committed several terror attacks against the Japanese populace.
Well-Known Contemporary Movements	11	"The Montana Freemen"	Our de jure county government pursuant to the Word of Almighty God	Montana Freemen	A textbook recounting the religious ideas of a sovereign citizen movement group known for their involvement in a standoff with the FBI. According to Daniels, the document "comes via a tortuous chain of connections".
Well-Known Contemporary Movements	12	"Comet Hale-Bopp, Planet Nibiru, the Mass Landing, and Heaven’s Gate"	"Crew from the Evolutionary Level above Human Offers—Last Chance to Advance beyond Human"	Marshall Applewhite	A document posted by Heaven's Gate, whose members committed mass suicide in March 1997, as a call for others to join them.

== Reception ==
A Doomsday Reader received largely positive reviews from critics. Reviewers called it timely, and praised its inclusion of some obscure and interesting texts. Mike Tribby for Booklist said that "this crash course in doomsday literacy may provide as much as many libraries will ever need on some of its contents". Publishers Weekly called it savvy, while Andrew Honigman for the magazine Fate praised it as a valuable work, saying the entries were carefully selected and fascinating, and that they were put into perspective by Daniels. Honigman said it "can help one understand why some choose profound alienation over compromise with an imperfect world".

John Bugge for Utopian Studies praised Daniels's analysis throughout and the bibliography, the latter of which he called "an exciting and provocative mix of the scholarly and the weirdly sensational". He complimented Daniels's basic thesis of millenarian consequences as "well enunciated and [...] thoroughly documented", but said it was aimed at an unclear audience, both explaining basic aspects of the topic in the introduction as if to a general reader and covering relatively high-level or specialist material. Robert Glenn Howard for the journal Western Folklore was more mixed in his assessment of the work, saying that while he was appreciative of Daniels's long history of work in the field of millennialist studies, the book was judgemental of those Daniels was covering as merely fringe and it was unclear about whether apocalypticism was "a vernacular discourse" or a fringe belief. Bugge noted the title and cover as somewhat lurid, in contrast to the "learned and unexceptionably reserved" text; he also found it strange that the excerpts of the texts were relatively short, and hence found the title inaccurate as it was not truly a "reader". Brannon Wheeler said that "readers can find basic factual information and useful bibliographic references but should not expect theoretically-based analysis."

Bugge praised its inclusion of the texts of the more obscure sects, calling these the central attraction of the book rather than the more well-known ones, and Daniels's introduction and analysis of each. Howard called the work "innovative" but said Daniels had "bitten off far more than he can chew". Despite this criticism, Howard argued that Daniels's point of the commonality of apocalyptic tropes to Western discourse was not completely addressed in the existing scholarship. Howard argued that though Daniels pointed apocalypticism out in many mainstream belief systems, in the book Daniels seemed only interested in the more fringe varieties. Howard argued this made the book only representative of the fringes, and therefore it did not properly evidence Daniels's argument that millennialism was common to all world religions.
