= Brannon Wheeler =

Scholar of religious studies

Brannon M. Wheeler is a scholar of religious studies and Professor in the department of History at the United States Naval Academy.

== Biography ==
Wheeler received his PhD from the University of Chicago in Near Eastern Languages and Civilizations in 1993. He was a senior Fulbright Research Fellow for Jordan, Egypt and Saudi Arabia in 2004. He has been a visiting scholar at numerous universities in the US, Europe, and the Middle East.

== Works ==
- Animal Sacrifice and the Origins of Islam (2022)
- Mecca and Eden (2006)
- Historical Dictionary of Prophets in Islam and Judaism with Scott B. Noegel (2002)
- Moses in the Qurʼan and Islamic exegesis (2002)
- Teaching Islam (2002)
- Prophets in the Quran: An Introduction to the Quran and Muslim Exegesis (2002)
- Applying the Canon in Islam (1996)
