= Klaatu =

Klaatu may refer to:

- Klaatu (The Day the Earth Stood Still), the protagonist in the 1951 science fiction film and its 2008 remake
- Klaatu (band), a Canadian progressive-rock group formed in 1973
  - Klaatu (album), the U.S. name for their first album, 3:47 EST
- Klaatu (comics), a Marvel Comics alien
- The Klaatu Diskos, a young-adult book series by Pete Hautman
- Klaatu, alien antagonists in Starfleet Orion, a 1978 science-fiction strategy game

== See also ==
- Klaatu barada nikto, an iconic phrase from The Day the Earth Stood Still
