= Larry King Show =

American radio talk show

- Country of origin: United States
- Language: English
- Syndicates: Mutual Broadcasting System
- TV adaptations: C-SPAN
- Hosted by: Larry King
- Recording studio: Crystal City, Virginia, U.S.

The Larry King Show was an American overnight radio talk show hosted by Larry King, broadcast nationally over the Mutual Broadcasting System from January 30, 1978 to May 27, 1994. A typical program consists of King interviewing a guest, then taking phone calls from listeners for the guest, and then taking phone calls on any topic. The program won a Peabody Award in 1982.

== Origin ==
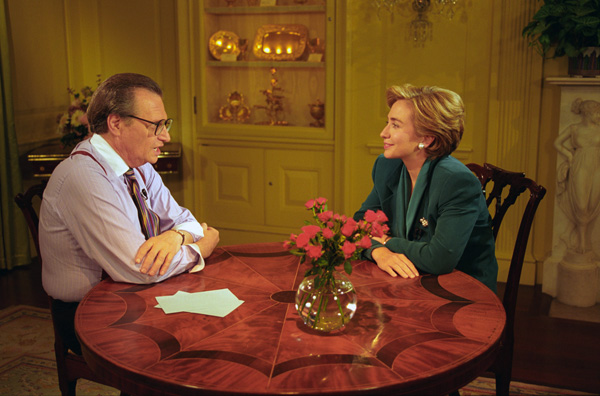
King interviewing Hillary Clinton in 1993

In January 1978, Larry King, at that time a virtually unknown local talk show host at radio station WIOD in Miami, Florida, was hired by the Mutual Broadcasting System to host a nationwide radio talk program. King inherited an overnight time slot that had previously been hosted by "Long John" Nebel and Candy Jones on Mutual during 1977 and had been pioneered by Herb Jepko in 1975. The main reason King got the Mutual job is that he had once been an announcer at WGMA in Hollywood, Florida, which was then owned by C. Edward Little. Little went on to become president of Mutual and he hired King as Nebel's replacement.

King's debut program on Mutual was broadcast from Miami, on January 30, 1978, where his first guest was Don Shula, head coach of the Miami Dolphins. After nine weeks, production of the show moved to Mutual's main studios in Crystal City, Virginia, near Washington, D.C. The program was initially carried by 28 stations and rapidly developed a large and devoted audience who became known as "King-aholics". The show was initially "offered on a barter basis so stations could trade advertising time for the opportunity to carry the show", providing stations with a low-cost overnight program.

== Show format ==
Mutual broadcast The Larry King Show live Monday through Friday from midnight to 5:30 a.m. Eastern Time. King would interview a guest for the first hour, with callers asking questions that continued the interview for another two hours, followed by two and a half hours of Open Phone America, during which callers could discuss any topic of their choice. In the western time zones, the program began at 12:05 a.m. with Open Phone America broadcast live, followed by a tape delay broadcast of the three hour guest segment.

When interviewing authors, King claimed that he never read their books in advance, so that he would not know more about the book than his audience. King said "The less I know, the better I feel about a person or book."

King recalled that due to the number of calls coming in during the early days of the show "there was more than one occasion when [area code] 703 blew". King said that he originally wanted a toll-free telephone number for call-in, but came to believe that he got a better quality of calls and would discourage possible prank calls when the callers had to pay for them. The show was very successful, beginning with 28 affiliates in 1978, growing to more than 200 by early 1980; when King retired from the program in 1994, it was being carried by over 500 stations. In 1985, King began appearing on television as host of the CNN interview program Larry King Live; he continued to broadcast his Mutual radio show later in the evening.

During the 1980s, C-SPAN would annually videotape, and then repeatedly show an entire broadcast of King's Mutual radio program on cable TV. Some years, C-SPAN would simulcast the Mutual radio broadcast, so that TV viewers could watch the show live (as radio listeners normally heard it).

King said that his two most difficult interviews were actors Demond Wilson and Robert Mitchum. Wilson apparently "did not want to be there", and Mitchum gave only one word answers, said King in a 1990 interview. In 1981, guest Rod McKuen offered to send a copy of his latest album to any listener who proved they bought his new book by sending him the inside cover flap; he ended up receiving 289,000 flaps. When Ted Turner appeared as a guest on the show in 1984, he invited King to join CNN as host of a television show that would eventually become Larry King Live.

During the 1980s, The Larry King Show was the most-listened-to talk radio program in America until it was supplanted by The Rush Limbaugh Show in 1991.

=== Open Phone America ===
At 3 a.m., during the segment known as Open Phone America, King would allow callers to discuss any topic of their choice, until the end of the program, when he expressed his own political opinions. Most stations in the western time zones would carry Open Phone America live beginning at 12:05 a.m., followed by the guest interview on tape delay. Thus listeners from across the country could call into Open Phone America. As the show became successful, King was able to favor stations which carried his whole show live, as when he switched his Los Angeles carrier to KMPC from the more powerful KFI.

Callers to the show would be told (on air) to call the number and "Let the connection ring. We'll answer when it's your turn." Some of King's regular callers used pseudonyms, or nicknames given by King such as "The Numbers Guy", "The (Syracuse) Chair", "The Portland Laugher", "the Whittier Whistler", "The Scandal Scooper", and "The Miami Derelict".

== Humor ==
King would occasionally entertain his audience by telling supposedly true amusing anecdotes from his youth and early career in radio, such as a story about when he and his friends faked the death of a schoolmate. In another, King told of his misadventures trying to sell a Baby Tender. King placed future Hall-of-Fame pitcher Sandy Koufax into his Carvel ice cream story, the most popular anecdote with listeners. The Carvel story was later revealed to be untrue, when Koufax stated that he didn't know King at the time the story supposedly took place (although King and Koufax grew up in the same Brooklyn neighborhood, Koufax said that the two never met until after King became famous on radio; further investigation into several other details prove the entire tale was a fabrication). Another of King's popular stories involved him at his first job as a young disc jockey, leaving the radio station while on the air to romance a lady listener across town. Again, later scrutiny of some details indicate the story to be false. As a result, the veracity of King's other stories and anecdotes have also been called into question. When initially questioned about the spurious stories, King coyly evaded the subject but he later stated "I should never have done that. I used to do it just to improve my own ego." In his 2009 autobiography, King repeated the Carvel story but replaced Koufax with "Howie Weiss".

The show also occasionally featured a "fictional alien, Gork of the planet Fringus", "a Brooklyn-accented intergalactic Donald Duck" "who supposedly existed [31 days] in the future, giving highlights of the coming [month] on Earth". Gork was voiced by King's long-time friend Herb Cohen. During the early years of the program, King would occasionally play music featuring the "Mutual Symphony Orchestra".

== Final year ==
Beginning in 1981, Jim Bohannon became King's primary guest host. Bohannon soon gained his own audience and in 1984, he began hosting his own Saturday night call-in show on Mutual with a format identical to King's program. In 1993, in accordance with King's desire to reduce his workload, Mutual moved The Larry King Show to a shorter afternoon time slot; King's original overnight time slot was taken over by Bohannon. At that time, most radio stations with a talk show format had an established policy of scheduling local programming in the late afternoons (3 to 6 p.m. Eastern Time) when Mutual now broadcast King's program.

As a result, many of King's overnight affiliates declined to carry the daytime show and it was unable to generate the same number of listeners. After sixteen years on Mutual, King decided to resign from the program, with his final broadcast heard on May 27, 1994. David Brenner took over King's afternoon slot on Mutual, hosting The David Brenner Show until 1996. Mutual affiliates were given the option of carrying the audio of King's new CNN evening television program. Westwood One, owner of Mutual since 1985, continued to air a radio simulcast of King's CNN show until December 31, 2009. Bohannon continued to host King's original late night slot until shortly before his death in November 2022. Bohannon was replaced by Rich Valdes; Valdes resigned from the program in November 2025 and on December 1, 2025, McGraw Milhaven began hosting the show.

George Washington University, in Washington, D.C., holds the archives of this show.
