= Herb Jepko =

American radio talk show host

Herbert Earl Jepko (born William Jepko; March 20, 1931 – March 31, 1995) was an influential radio talk show host in Salt Lake City from 1964 to 1990. He was the first radio talk show host to do a nationally syndicated, satellite-delivered program.

== Early years ==
Herb Jepko was born in Hayden, Colorado to a single mother named Mary Irene Parke. He was originally named William, but when he was adopted by Metro and Nellie Jepko of Prescott, Arizona, they renamed him Herbert Earl Jepko. Metro and Nellie's marriage was not a happy one. After they divorced, Metro got custody, but he was a wounded World War I veteran, and he soon took ill. With his father unable to care for him, Herb had to spend time in foster care off and on. He attended school in Prescott, but then his father got healthy enough to take care of him again, and in 1949, they moved to Phoenix. Jepko graduated high school there, and briefly attended Phoenix College, which was then a small two-year college and is today flagship of the Maricopa Community College system. He aspired to become a doctor, but soon ran out of money and was drafted into the Army. It was during his time in the military that he discovered his life's work—radio, working in Radio-Television Operations while serving in the Korean War.

After completing his military service, he found work in radio at several stations around the Western United States, including KVNA (AM) in Flagstaff, Arizona, and KFI in Los Angeles. It was while he was the promotion director at KFI that he was influenced by a popular late night host named Ben Hunter, whose overnight call-in program was called the Night Owl show. Hunter's work was getting positive attention, and Herb was impressed with how loyal the late-night audience was. He stayed in LA throughout the rest of the 50s, where he married Patsy Little Brown (listeners would later know her as 'Pat'). Jepko, Patsy and their five children from previous marriages moved to Salt Lake City, her home town, in the early 1960s. They later had one child together, Herb Jepko Junior.

== Radio career ==
Herb was hired by several Salt Lake City-area stations, including KCPX, where he played jazz for the late night audience; and a new station, KANN in Ogden, Utah, where he did the afternoon drive segment. In 1962, Herb joined KSL first doing afternoons, and then in April 1963, becoming the station's morning show disc jockey, a shift he held throughout the rest of 1963. Despite being in a very visible shift, Herb was puzzled that KSL signed off at midnight, even though it was Utah's most powerful station; its booming 50,000-watt clear channel signal reached most of the western half of North America. He knew how successful Ben Hunter's program had been, and he believed there was a similar late night audience in Salt Lake City that was not being served. On February 11, 1964, Herb's late-night show aired for the first time. It was an open-mic call-in show, initially known as The Other Side of the Day, and later named Nitecap in a contest for a new name held among listeners early in the show's first year. In 1975, the show was picked up by the Mutual Broadcasting System and was first heard nationwide on November 4 of that year. The show became the first nationally syndicated call-in talk radio program. One of the stations that carried the show was Mutual affiliate WHAS in Louisville, a 50,000-watt "flamethrower" like KSL. The two stations' combined signals brought Nitecap to nearly all of North America.

Jepko's groundbreaking 1975 debut on Mutual is often cited as the show that launched the nationally broadcast talk-radio format that allowed for the rise of such hosts as Larry King, Phil Donahue and Jim Bohannon. Ironically, when Jepko's Mutual contract was terminated on May 29, 1977, he was replaced first by the husband and wife team of Long John Nebel and Candy Jones and then in January, 1978 by Larry King. Reportedly, Mutual had offered Jepko a chance to continue his program if he would become more controversial and try to attract a younger audience, but he adamantly refused, feeling he had an obligation to his existing, largely older and rural, loyal listeners.

The Herb Jepko Nitecap Show was idiosyncratic, never focusing on any single topic. Carrying a laid-back atmosphere inherent to its then-unusual 12:00 a.m. – 6:00 a.m. time slot, the show consisted entirely of listener call-ins: any subject the listener wished to talk about, no matter how trivial, was allowed, and the only forbidden topics were politics and denominational religion. Later, as the show became more popular, callers were limited to one call every two weeks of no more than 5 minutes. Jepko would run a music box known as "Tinkerbell", which played a rendition of the song "Never on Sunday", to indicate that the caller's time was up.

The majority of Jepko's listeners were elderly, shut-ins, long-distance truckers and invalids, but many were also night owls and insomniacs who enjoyed hearing a friendly voice in the middle of the night. Talk radio hosts were frequently abrasive, sarcastic and impatient, but Jepko, who was affectionately called "Herbie" by his listeners, was known for being warm, friendly, patient and thoroughly non-controversial. In 1965, he told an interviewer that he hoped his show would contribute to "good will and understanding", and that his listeners would feel they were part of a family.

== Jepko and the Nitecaps ==
Nitecaps was more than just a radio show. It was a club — the Nitecaps International Association. Local members formed chapters, called "Nitestands". Members took Jepko's message about good will to heart, and volunteered their time to the elderly, ill, service men and women and shut-ins; Nitestands were not only for socializing with other fans of the show, but they were an opportunity to do charitable work in each local community. And sometimes, Jepko would come to town and do a live broadcast. Additionally, Herb and Patsy sponsored an annual convention for members, giving them an opportunity to meet each other. That sense of community was especially important, and Jepko promoted it whenever possible. The Nitecaps show had its own magazine, called "The Wick", and its own theme song — written by listener Della Dame, and performed by local musician Don Ray (the song was chosen by listeners from another on-air contest of listener-created songs). Jepko also created a Nitecaps travel agency, and an insurance company, as well as compiling recipe books from recipes sent in by listeners. In fact, any Nitecaps listener could find a variety of merchandise that was available for purchase, often marketed in the pages of the Wick.

The show had many regular callers, some of whom became celebrities of sorts among the listeners. They included "Maggie", an organist from California who often played songs for the listeners, a retired beekeeper named Leon, and a young caller from the East Coast known by the pseudonym "The Slasher". At a Nitecaps convention in Hunt Valley, Maryland, "The Slasher" delighted many (including Mr. Jepko himself) by making a personal appearance. After Jepko was dropped by Mutual in May 1977, his fans were very upset and insisted that he somehow stay on the air. Jepko cobbled together fourteen stations, including the powerful KSL, which became the new "Nitecap Radio Network".

Unfortunately by this time (unlike the early 1960s), Herb had plenty of late-night competition including cable TV, 24-hour radio stations and the increasingly popular Larry King, who replaced Jepko and Nebel on Mutual. When KSL dropped the show in late 1978, Herb continued the show on a handful of stations, eventually bankrupting his personal assets in an effort to keep going. Several attempts were made to resurrect the program, including one with clear-channel WOAI in the early 1980s, but none proved successful or long-lasting.

== Final years ==
Despite his popularity, Jepko did not significantly profit from his work. According to a former colleague, his Nitecaps show had been financially successful, but his deal with Mutual was not to his advantage. Where he and his staff had done all the selling of commercial time on the KSL program, Mutual insisted on doing the selling for the syndicated show. There were problems almost immediately, resulting in on-going friction between the way Mutual wanted things done and how Jepko thought things ought to be. Jepko ended up convinced that Mutual did not understand his unique audience. Mutual, on the other hand, faced with challenges in convincing affiliates to carry the show (only around 70 of Mutual's over 500 affiliates ever carried Jepko's program) decided Jepko's audience was too old, unsophisticated, and not large enough to bring in a profit for the network. As Jepko perceived it, Mutual betrayed their original contract with him and gave up on the show. By the time Jepko's contract with Mutual ended, he had lost most of whatever money his original Nitecaps show had brought him.

Jepko's youngest son, Herbert Earl Jr., died of AIDS in 1992. Jepko's health quickly declined after that, and there is anecdotal evidence from former colleagues that he had a drinking problem for years, which escalated during this time. The cause of his death was given as liver failure.

Some of his former listeners still recall him fondly as proving that a talk show could be kinder and gentler and still attract a wide audience at a time when radio was becoming more controversial with both hosts and listeners/talkers more angry.

In 2003, Herb Jepko was posthumously inducted into the Utah Broadcaster Association's Hall of Fame and there is an effort to establish a Memorial scholarship fund in his name at the University of Utah, see www.nitecaps.net link below.

On July 6, 2020 Clyde Lewis on his show Ground Zero said that "Herb Jepko was Art Bell before there was Art Bell..." and credited Jepko as an inspiration for his radio career, as well as Edward R. Murrow, Paul Harvey, Rush Limbaugh and Bell.

== Works cited ==
(1) Hilly Rose. "But That's Not What I Called About." Chicago: Contemporary Books, 1978, p. 48.

(2) Lynn Arave. "Utah Helped Shape U.S. Radio." Deseret (Salt Lake City) Morning News, 16 February 2007.

(3) James Bapis. "Utah Radio Program Rekindles Human Values, Listeners Say." Ogden (UT) Standard-Examiner, 25 July 1965, p. 16.

(4) Mitch Broder. "Small-talk Show is Big Draw in Wee Hours." New York Times, 23 February 1975, p. D29.

(5) Michael Keith (editor). Sounds in the Night. Ames IA: Iowa State University Press, 2001. (quoted material comes from pp. 96–8)

(6) Keith, p. 218; see also Mark Fisher. Something in the Air. New York: Random House, 2007. quote comes from p. 117)

(7) "Herb Jepko, Friend of Insomniacs Across the Nation, Dies at Age 64." Salt Lake City (UT) Tribune, 2 April 1995, p. B3.
