= Harry Conover =

American business executive (1911–1965)

- Born: Harry Sayles Conover; August 29, 1911
- Died: July 21, 1965 (aged 53)
- Occupations: American radio performer, model and business executive
- Modeling information
- Agency: John Robert Powers Modeling Agency

Harry Sayles Conover (August 29, 1911 – July 21, 1965), was an American radio performer, model and business executive. He was known for creating the term "Cover Girl".

== Growing up, education ==
He was from Chicago, Illinois, and was of Irish descent. His father, Harry S. Conover, was a bigamist who left the family shortly after he was born. Conover's mother, Mary Byrnes Conover, wanted him to become a Roman Catholic priest. Conover said he was not only poor, but also relatively uneducated. Conover went to school at Peekskill Military Academy, further north of New York City, in the lower Hudson River Valley of upstate New York, in Peekskill, New York.

== Early career ==
He worked a variety of jobs including being a dough mixer in a bakery, being a disc jockey and a necktie salesman. He later became an old time radio soap opera programs performer.

He accompanied a female friend to an interview at the prominent John Robert Powers' modeling agency of New York City for a modeling job. His friend got nervous and Conover did the talking for both of them, landing both of them jobs as models. While the Powers agency had a near monopoly on models at that time, Conover eventually worked his way into becoming a competitor, but also a personal friend.

== Conover Model Agency ==
In 1939, Conover went out on his own and invested $500 into a one-room office which served as the headquarters of his new "Conover Model Agency". A decade later, he had 12 office suites in the same building and was making over $2,000,000 a year.

Conover had unique ideas about modeling, saying that models needed to be "deglamorized" and preferred his models to have a "natural outdoors" look over a "sophisticated" look. Conover also looked for what he called, "that inner glow".

Conover was credited with inventing and copyrighting the term, "Cover Girl". Conover was also credited with launching the careers of actresses Joan Caulfield, Shelley Winters, Nina Fech, Anita Colby, Jinx Falkenburg, Patricia Blair, and Constance Ford. He had also hired models like Joan Bennett Kennedy (future first wife of U.S. Senator Ted Kennedy of Massachusetts), along with Sandra Dee and C. Z. Guest. His models were said to have a knack for reaching stardom and Conover created names for models which helped attract attention. By 1945, he employed over 200 models, earning $150,000 in commissions.

Conover's modeling agency collapsed two decades later in 1959. He was being sued for withholding money from models and his agency lost its license. Conover then began working for charm schools. Conover later went bankrupt.

== Personal life ==
He married Gloria Dalton in 1940. Dalton had modeled for Conover prior to their marriage. Dalton was said to be one of the most glamorous models of the 1940s. The couple later divorced with Dalton accusing him of "extreme mental cruelty". He married again to Candy Jones in 1946 and the couple had then three children together, but they divorced 13 years later in 1959 At the time of his death, Conover had a total of five children and a grandson.

Conover was said to be best friends with future political leader Gerald R. Ford, who later became the 38th US President. Ford had lent him $1,500 to start his modelling agency back in 1939.

Conover died on July 21, 1965, at Elmhurst City Hospital due to a heart attack. He was 53 years old.
