= Paulina Peavy =

American artist

- Born: August 24, 1901; Old Colorado City, Colorado, U.S.
- Died: November 18, 1999 (aged 98); Bethesda, Maryland, U.S.
- Education: Oregon State University, Chouinard School of Art, Los Angeles, California
- Known for: Painting, sculpture, literature
- Movement: Abstract Art, Occultism, Modernism, Spiritualism, Surrealism

Paulina Peavy (1901–1999) was an American artist, inventor, designer, sculptor, poet, writer, and lecturer. Best known for her paintings, her work incorporates both mythical and spiritual iconography. Around 1932 she attended a seance held in the home of Rev. Ida L. Ewing, the pastor of The National Federation of Spiritual Science, Church No. 68, in Santa Ana, California. Peavy would later recall that she first encountered “Lacamo”, a spirit from another world whom she called her “spirit muse,” during one of the weekly trance meetings. Afterward when she painted, she claimed that Lacamo directed her brush. She sometimes wore a mask to channel Lacamo’s energy. Her paintings were exhibited in Los Angeles, San Francisco, and New York during her life time and have recently resurfaced in exhibitions. The works reflect her (and Lacamo’s) belief that humanity was slowly moving toward an androgynous species, which she called “one-gender perfection,” through contact with advanced beings, or UFOs (“Unidentified Foreign Objects”).

== Early life ==
Pauline Peavy (White) was born in Colorado Springs, Colorado on August 24, 1901. Peavy's family lived in Colorado until 1906. The family moved West to Portland, Oregon that year, where Peavy spent much of her childhood. At the age of eight, her mother died, leaving her father to raise her. In her unpublished manuscript The Story of My Life with a UFO, Peavy recalls that, “it was my father’s belief that education would be wasted on girls ----- as they only shall marry and bear children.” After elementary school, Peavy's father encouraged her to attend Portland's Benson Polytechnic High School, where co-education was relatively new. At that time, trade courses for female students were limited to cooking and sewing.

White later attended Oregon State University where she first studied art. Her mentor was the art department chair and acclaimed American illustrator, Farley McLouth. While a student at the university, she met her future husband, Bradley A. Peavy (b. 1898). The Peavys were a powerful family in Corvallis, Oregon. Bradley’s father, George Wilcox Peavy, was the dean of the forestry college. He would later become the president of the college and mayor of Corvallis. Shortly before graduating from Oregon State, the art department was temporarily closed due to McLouth's untimely death from influenza in 1923. The closure forced White to change majors. Instead of art, she completed her degree in vocational education. She married Peavy the same year. The following year the couple moved to southern California. Peavy gave birth to two sons while living in San Pedro, California. Her first son, Bradley Adelbert Peavy, was born in 1924 and her second son, Wesley Peavy, was born in 1926.

In 1927, Paulina Peavy won an advanced scholarship for 9 months paid tuition at the Chouinard Art Institute in Los Angeles (now part of the California Institute of the Arts) where she would eventually study with visiting artists Hans Hofmann and Morgan Russell. An undated resume she later wrote indicates that she finished her MA at Chouinard, although the school did not yet officially offer such a degree at that time. In 1929, Paulina opened the Peavy Studio of Art and Architecture and Peavy Art Gallery in San Pedro in a building she had designed. The venue hosted classes by Peavy and others as well as exhibitions of contemporary art. As a young woman, Paulina found herself married to an alcoholic man prone to violence. She filed for divorce in 1932. While Paulina was in a sanitarium for tuberculosis in early 1933, her husband Bradley took both boys to his parents’ house in Oregon. When Paulina recovered, she retrieved the boys from Oregon and eventually won custody.

Independent for the first time in her life, Peavy and her two sons continued to live in San Pedro before settling in Long Beach, California in the mid-1930s. She supported the family by teaching art in local schools. For a period, she left the boys with The Boys and Girls Aid Society in Pasadena, California. According to a later interview in a New York newspaper called the Brooklyn Eagle, she taught in the art department of a school in Long Beach for 14 years. After living in California since 1923, she moved to New York, New York in 1943, where she remained until the age of 97.

== Spiritual and philosophical ideas ==
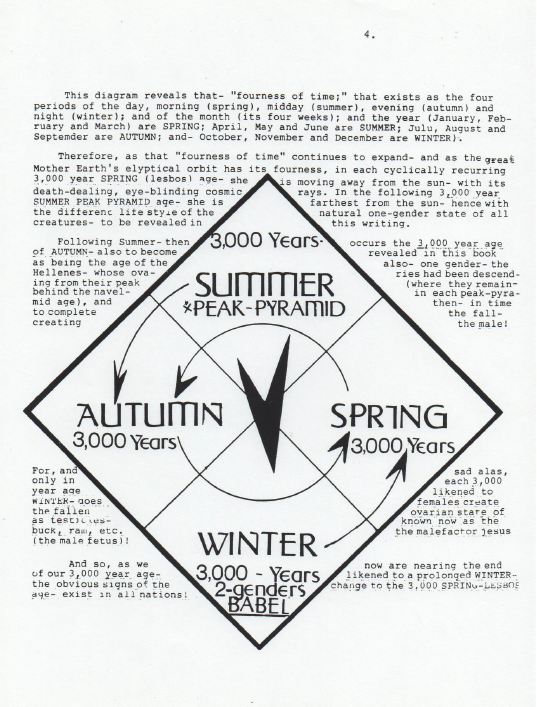
This is a page of Peavy's manuscript defining her seasons.

In about 1932, Peavy began attending weekly séances at the home of Ida Ewing of Santa Ana, whom she described as “a trance medium.” It was there that she said she first met Lacamo (pronounced LA-cum-mo), a spirit that Peavy called a UFO, or “Unidentified Foreign Object.” Although Lacamo originally channeled his communications through Ewing, eventually the spirit "spoke" directly to Peavy. In her 1982 film, Mountain of Myrrh/UFO, she describes her first encounter with the UFO as seeing a “great cloud and fire unfolding itself, and a brightness was about itself, the color of amber. . . . The spirit of the living creations was in the wheels. As for this ring [meaning sound], they were so high they were dreadful. Wherever the living creature went, the wheels went. The flying saucer’s spacecraft form is planetary, consisting of an aggregation of hierarchical egos, a vast pulsating living power unit, promulgated as seed around a central nucleus. Being seed in constant metamorphosis, they create themselves mentally by the brow in any form in any place in the universe and by feat of travel that their thought enacts upon. Their genesis is wholly mental.” Lacamo, through Ewing, instructed Peavy to read Isis Unveiled (1877) by Helena Petrovna Blavatsky, a Russian philosopher and co-founder of the Theosophical Society whose ideas inspired the work of other artists like Hilma af Klint. The Bible and Christian Theology figured prominently in Peavy's work throughout her life. A 1946 article by Margaret Mara published in the Brooklyn Eagle reads, “Interpreting the parables in the Bible with a paint brush is the gigantic task undertaken by Paulina Peavy, modernistic painter, who has evolved some amazing theories following 10 years of biblical research.” But her philosophy of the cosmos moved beyond established theosophical and religious tests. She also recalls that Lacamo instructed her to “reduce all capitallised [sic] words in the Bible- to their low case and then wholly scientific meanings; as example- biology- embryology- etc.!” Through these synthetic visions, her philosophy and images combined modern conventions of science with historical religious philosophy.

Lacamo continued to teach Peavy and co-author works with her for over 50 years. For Peavy, Lacamo existed beyond human conceptions of gender and identity. According to her, Lacamo revealed a vision of the future in which single-sex female reproduction would render men unnecessary. Her worldview hinged on the idea that humans were continually reincarnated until they became “pharaohs,” or “free souls” who had achieved “one-gender perfection." In her art, pyramids represent this evolution. Over time, she developed a philosophy that the world evolved through 12,000 year cycles composed of four seasons of 3,000 years each—the spring age, summer pyramid age, autumn age, and winter age. “The male” only appeared during the winter age, which she also referred to as “Babel.” In her writings, films, and paintings, Peavy advanced her belief that humankind was “nearing the end of our 3,000 year age- likened to a prolonged WINTER” and that soon the spring age, where humanity ascended to “one-gender perfection” would arrive. Curator Bill Arning has drawn a connection between Peavy and radical feminists like Valerie Solanis, who wrote a book called the SCUM Manifesto arguing that men were an unnecessary evil. Her paintings were revealed to her. She felt herself to be the physical maker, but not the spiritual author. Through the act of painting and revising, which she did continually, the images revealed their meaning to her over a long span of time.

== Work ==
As an artist, Peavy worked in painting, drawing, sculpture, block printing, writing, poetry, and film. Her work, particularly her mixed-media and Phantasma series, developed a personal symbology consisting of shapes that resembled energy beams, solar systems, and organic shapes that represented ovaries, genitalia, sperm, and fetuses.

=== Paintings, drawings, and mixed-media ===
Working in thin layers of jewel-toned oil paint, Peavy composed multi-layered images with translucent colors that often referenced her belief in an electric and cosmic relationship between the human brain and higher sources. Her subjects range from her earlier representational works, like the paintings she exhibited at the Golden Gate International Exposition in San Francisco, California, to abstract works of geometric and organic shapes. Most of her works are undated, but it is presumed that she began working in this style of oil painting during the 1930s, perhaps while at the Chouinard Art Institute, and continued through the 1970s. In an interview with the Brooklyn Eagle, Peavy describes her technique as “a revolt in art school teachings as well as being the result of research in the bible.” In the same interview, she says, “My paintings attempt to ‘create life’ on canvas, even as my mother created me and as I created my two sons.” Her oil paintings have a hard, almost mirrored surface that resembles enamel as a result of her painting style. During the 1970s and 1980s, she returned to many of her earlier paintings and reworked them in sharper shapes that resembled crystals. Because of this practice a single painting can represent decades of work. In her 1987 film, UFO Identified, Peavy describes her watercolors as depicting creation, or conception: “Light at the moment of conception, the seed nuclear. The tongue of flames ascend and descend of the egg nucleus and then there is light.”

Between 1975 and 1984, Peavy worked with watercolor, pen, collage, and ink. She often signed both these later works and her earlier ones with her name as well as Lacamo’s. Many of the watercolors are dated. The earliest is dated to 1953. In addition, some have two dates, suggesting that she would return to a work many years later.

=== Exhibition and critical reception ===
The complexity of her constructed cosmos and the technical skill with which she executed her images occasionally stymied, but often impressed reviewers and the public. From 1933 to 1936, Peavy exhibited at the San Francisco Museum of Art, Stanford University, the Gump Galleries in San Francisco, the Stendahl Galleries in Los Angeles, the Palos Verdes Gallery in Palos Verdes, and Delphic Studios in New York City. In early 1936, she stayed with Brigadier General Charles F. Humphrey and his wife. The visit was recorded in the Army and Navy Journal, which described her as “a noted California artist.”

In 1939, she was invited to participate in the Golden Gate International Exposition in San Francisco, California, where she showed thirty paintings in the Temple of Religion and gave daily lectures. Artist Diego Rivera was on site painting a mural at the Exposition during the following year. The reception of her work at the exposition was mixed, but she considered the event a highlight of her life. At the time, a major art critic, Alfred Frankenstein, found some of her work was “quite good,” but that the majority were “curious affairs, glazed hard as mirrors, making much rather monotonous use of concentric circles in drapery, beads, aureoles and curlicues of sorts.” In response, Peavy wrote a letter to the editor entitled “Artist Amazed”:

I wish to thank Mr. Frankenstein for reviewing my exhibitions at the Temple of Religion, but I am amazed that he, with the reputation of being one of the most intelligent art critics of the Bay Area, has followed the examples of unthinking people throughout the ages—that is, to condemn that which they do not understand. Might it have ever occurred to Mr. Frankenstein that the queer gyrations of my paintings, as he has expressed it, might be an expression of the same God-given fundamental principles (as yet not understood) embodied in the structural and philosophical principles of the ancient Pyramids and even the ancient Egyptians’ art?

In 1941, Peavy debuted a large panel of the biblical “last supper” at the San Diego Fine Arts Gallery. Peavy’s panel was fourteen by six feet and painted on stretched canvas. The original image was a representational depiction of Jesus Christ at the center, surrounded by other figures. She brought the painting with her to New York and, as with many of her works, she eventually painted over it and renamed the image “Crystallization of Matter.” That painting was destroyed when Peavy moved to Bethesda, Maryland, at the end of her life around 1998. Fortunately, a partial original image survived as a postcard. The later painting, an abstract mosaic of pyramids and other geometric shapes, demonstrates how her work evolved, as she documents in her book The Story of My Life With a "UFO" and in her films from the 1980’s. In 1943, for reasons not entirely known, Peavy moved from Long Beach, California, to New York, New York. The only record she has left of her decision is in her unpublished manuscript, The Story of My Life with a "UFO": "The dictionary defined ‘destiny’- as ‘-that which is to happen to a particular person or thing.’ And so, obviously it was in my destiny to move to New York in 1942.” In 1943, Peavy had a solo exhibition in Manhattan at the Argent Gallery. Art Digest's Maud Riley wrote a glowing review of her exhibition in an article entitled “Electronics in Paint”:

Mrs. Peavy has technical equipment equal to Dali. But instead of using her inherent ability developed, certainly, in the cases of both by dint of long hard work to give vicarious thrilled of the unnatural and decadent, as Dali does, this artist tells a tale of the abstract forces of thought abroad in the world and attempts to give validity to the belief that the mind is real. She gives form to the ‘electronic structure,’ and these forms are no more unworldly than Dali’s melting watches. To do this, the artist devised a technique that defies analysis. She paints plasmas similarly to Matta’s, uses church window colors of intense reds and blues, creates forms which are neither plant nor animal nor human. But they are not 'non-objective.' For many are built around the figures of Biblical characters and there is deep beauty in the faces of the subjects.

A review also ran in the New York Herald Tribune written by Carlyle Burrows under the heading “Mystic Symbolism.” He described Peavy's work as showing an “extraordinary creative talent, curiously romantic in its implications."

Throughout the 1940s, galleries continued to exhibit her work. In 1945, she showed her “Waterflames,” “Conception,” and “Sea of Life” series, as well as her large “last supper” painting under the title “The Supper of Peace,” at the Jurart Gallery at Sixth Avenue and Forty-sixth street. A year later, the Lawrence Terzian Gallery, 545 Fifth Avenue, New York, hosted a show of her work that was called “Genesis, Atomic Forces of Nature.” The New York Times ran an ambiguous review of the exhibition, while The Brooklyn Eagle printed a more favorable column on the paintings by Margaret Mara called “In Awe of Creative Powers, Impressionistic Painter of Biblical Parables Has Theories on Atom.” “In each of her paintings the artist depicts birth,” Mara writes, “which she describes as ‘the multiplying power of the human atom or life cell.’” By 1948, Peavy's work was being featured on posters sold by the American Cancer Society for fundraising purposes, who described her as “dedicating her life to a rich interpretation of the Bible.” Yet in the following decade, other than her development of a manikin made of articulated blocks for drawing in 1954, she seems to disappear from public view.

She must, however, have remained active as an artist and public figure because she appeared in live broadcasts of the Long John Nebel talk show on WOR in both 1958 and 1960. Nebel invited guests who had experienced paranormal events, including witchcraft, ghosts, UFOs, conspiracy theorists, and parasychology. Between 1954 and 1962, the show aired from midnight to 5:30 am seven days a week, and amassed a significant following across the continental United States. Peavy wore a mask, which Nebel described on air, and was in a trance through most of the interview. Lacamo spoke through her during the trance, and said “...we are using her exactly as you use your microphone. We are beings existing.”

Over the last thirty years of her life, Peavy seems to have continued producing and exhibiting art, although she increasingly began to use film and text as her mediums. In 1961, the New York Tribune listed an exhibition of her recent paintings in Crown Gallery, 881 Seventh Ave, New York. On her undated resume, she wrote that she had produced 1,000 paintings, a number she would have certainly surpassed by the end of her life.

=== Masks ===
The mask that Peavy wore when she appeared on the Long John Nebel show in 1958 and 1960 was just one of many that she created to facilitate a deeper trance. Her creativity depended on achieving a dream-state, where she could contact the higher plane where Lacamo resided. Peavy often cut the base of the mask out of leather, or other materials such as velvet or lace. Using beads, feathers, lace, buttons, and costume jewelry, she would decorate each mask individually. Each received titles like “Royal Foursquare”, “Duo Genius” or “Monumental Redundant.” It is unclear when she made many of the masks, but they featured heavily in her later films, especially the 1985 film entitled The Artist Behind the Mask.

She received a patent in 1966 and a trademark (72185234) in 1967 for an invention called “Mask-Eez,” which she describes as “adhesive facial covering devices and the like described as self-adhesive skin covering devices in sheet form, the adhesive layer of which impregnated with substances conducive to stimulating healing of the skin and layers therebelow [sic] when placed against the skin.”

=== Writings and films ===
Peavy's extant writings include several examples of her committing her philosophical ideas to the page later in life. In 1959, she began an unpublished manuscript entitled Various Kinds of Dissertations, which recorded various conversations with Lacamo and laid out her vision of the cosmos. When she finally finished the book in 1973, it was 121 pages long. She began to write poetry as well, including “Voice from Higher Dimensions” in 1960, which she claimed Lacamo had written through her. In another poem entitled “Resurrection of Atoms,” she articulates her view that reincarnation as a woman is the step before one-gender perfection as a pharaoh:

Therefore, as each female had been all sub-creature forms –

Including a human male, ultimately she has graduated out from

All lower creature forms- eventually becoming a pharaoh (fair-oh)-

And as a “creator pharaoh”- and eventually she

Graduates within the so-called higher dimension- as a UFO!

In the late 1980s, Peavy began writing her unpublished manuscript, The Story of My Life with a “UFO”. Although the book is undated, she does mention the diseases Alzheimer’s, which did not become a major concern until 1977, and the Auto Immune Deficiency Syndrome (AIDS), which was not discussed nationally until the mid-1980s. In 1993, she copyrighted five manuscript books: Various Kinds of Dissertations, which was a compilation of various writings; The Mad Nightingale In Search of God; A Spoof On Psychology, Biology, Sexology, Symbology, Government, and Religion, which was written by Peavy and Lacamo according to the title page; Psychology of Art and Composition, which was largely a design book without text; Philosophy & Poetry, also jointly-authored by Peavy and Lacamo; and The Story of My Life with a “UFO.”

Peavy, having experimented with filmmaking in the 1950s and 1960s, worked with a small production studio to complete a series of films in the 1980s. The first of these was Paulina, Artist-Philosopher, An Artist of Vision, which she copyrighted in 1981. That year, she exhibited it in the International Film & TV Festival of New York, where it won a bronze medal. For the next three years, she annually entered a film into the festival. In 1982, she won a bronze medal for Mountain of Myrrh, and another for Is the Moon a Burned-Out Sun in 1983. Male Sex then won her a silver award in 1984, and The Artist Behind the Mask won her final Bronze medal in 1985. Her films feature many of her paintings, which she narrates and describes in a calm voices accompanied by lilting music. Each capture a different aspect of her philosophy. Her final film, copyrighted in 1988, is Phantasma, Sixty Oil Paintings, A Self Portrait.

== Later life ==
An undated resume, left behind in ephemera kept by Peavy's family, sketches a picture of Peavy's movements after moving to New York City in 1943. At the top of the page, her address reads 390 West End Avenue, New York, NY, which places her on the Upper West Side. A marketing postcard lists an address at 320 West 78th Street. On the resume, she lists having held various jobs, from an art teacher for the New York City Board of Education to an architectural and engineering drafts-person for various companies. In addition, she lists herself as a lecturer at City College New York and at the American Museum of Natural History, where she spoke about “Phillians.” Although she showed at many galleries, she did not seem to find much commercial success. Likely, she supported herself by working odd jobs and teaching art. A 1954 article in the New York Herald Tribune describing the theft of a valuable statuette of Mrs. Dwight D. Eisenhower from a booth at the National Antique Show in Madison Square Garden describes a “Mrs. Pauline Peavy” as an assistant at the hall. According to her family, she began showing signs of dementia around 1996. Her son Bradley moved her to a nursing home in Bethesda, Maryland, in 1998 after she broke her hip. She died there in 1999, at the age of 98.

== Legacy ==
Despite some success during her lifetime, Peavy was relatively forgotten by the time she died. Her family kept her papers, paintings, and drawings, tucked away in a basement corner. A retrospective of her work, A Message to Paulina, was held at the Greater Reston Art Center in 2018; a Washington Post review described it as “exuberant, kaleidoscopic and beckoning.” The Andrew Edlin Gallery has represented her work since 2016. In 2018, Peavy's paintings were included in the gallery's group exhibition “April 14, 1561.” Roberta Smith reviewed the exhibition in The New York Times, and mentioned Peavy's work: “The abstractions representing Ms. Peavy here suggest brightly colored embryos or sleek flying saucers drifting among amniotic fluids or intergalactic ethers.” As interest in previously overlooked female spiritualist artists like Hilma af Klint and Emma Kunz grows, the art world has begun to recognize Paulina Peavy's achievements as an artist. Artist Jane Kaplowitz chose the 2019 exhibition of Paulina Peavy's work at the Andrew Edlin Gallery as her most memorable exhibition of 2019 in an Artforum round up of artists' artists. In 2021, Paulina Peavy's work was shown as part of the “Greater New York” show at MoMA PS1 and the show “Supernatural America: The Paranormal in American Art” which traveled from the Toledo Museum of Art to the Speed Art Museum in Louisville, Kentucky. (It is scheduled to travel to the Minneapolis Institute of Art in 2022.) A solo exhibition of her work, “Paulina Peavy: An Etherian Channeler” at Beyond Baroque Literary Arts Center, was listed in Hyperallergic as one of their ten best art shows in Los Angeles in 2021.
