= Herb Cohen (negotiator) =

American negotiation expert

- Born: April 27, 1933 (age 93); United States
- Citizenship: American
- Education: New York University (BA, Political Science) (JD, Law)

April 27, 1933

Herb Cohen is an American negotiation expert.

Cohen is a corporate and government negotiator and strategy consultant in areas of commercial dealings and crisis management. He is the author of the New York Times bestseller You Can Negotiate Anything and has written several articles and blogs, and has given countless speeches on topics related to deal-making, sales, negotiating, branding, and motivating.

In 1980, Herb Cohen was dubbed "The World's Best Negotiator" in Playboy magazine. Also, in the June 1981 issue of Time magazine, it is stated: "If you are ever in a crucial life-changing negotiation, the person you want on your side of the table is Herb Cohen."

In 1995, Publishers Weekly stated that You Can Negotiate Anything was the fifth-bestselling audiobook of all time.

Cohen, represented by the Executive Speakers Bureau, was selected as one of the five most In-Demand keynote speakers in North America in 2001.

== Early life and education ==
Cohen was born in United States, to Jewish immigrant parents. His friend since childhood, broadcaster Larry King, wrote a story describing "Herbie's" negotiating skills even as a child, which King regularly told on the Larry King Show. King had Cohen on his show both seriously as a negotiator and humorously as the voice of Gork of the planet Fringus. He studied Political Science as an undergraduate student at New York University and later earned his Juris Doctor degree in law.

== Career ==
Cohen's first formal experience with negotiation was a teaching a class on the subject for attorneys in 1963 while he was working as an insurance claims adjuster. According to CBN and numerous other online sources, Cohen coined the term "win-win negotiations" in 1963.

Cohen taught negotiating strategy as a consultant to corporations, governmental entities, and other organizations. He was a member of the faculty at the University of Michigan's Graduate School of Business. Cohen is also a frequent guest lecturer at a number of institutions: Harvard; Yale Law School; The Kellogg School; Wharton; University of Wisconsin; University of California, San Diego; McGill University; University of Chicago; and Columbia University.

In 1980, Cohen wrote You Can Negotiate Anything, which was originally published by Bantam Books and stayed on the New York Times' Best Seller List for nine months. In 2006, he authored Negotiate This!.

Cohen is also a notable keynote speaker. For more than twenty years, Cohen was a primary speaker for IBM'S "100% Club" meetings as well as the Golden Circle Awards and their executive programs in Sands Point, Glen Cove, and Armonk, all in New York, as well as in Southbury, Connecticut.

For almost three decades, Cohen conducted negotiating programs for top-level executives and the N.E.I. at the F.B.I.'s behavioral science unit, Quantico, Virginia, where he was instrumental in helping develop the acclaimed "hostage negotiating program."

Cohen's military career was in the 14th Armored Cavalry Regiment in Bad Kissingen, Germany from 1953 to 1955.

== Personal life ==
Cohen lives in the State of New York in the United States. From his marriage to wife Ellen Eisenstadt Cohen (deceased on April 4, 2014), he has three children and eleven grandchildren.

== Quotes ==
"A successful negotiation occurs when both sides discover an outcome they prefer over the status quo."

"Caring but not T-H-A-T much is the middle ground between clinging to it and winging it."

"All behavior no matter how outlandish appears appropriate to its initiator."

"People work for what they want but invariably want what they've worked for."
