= Richard Sharpe Shaver =

American writer and conspiracy theorist (1907–1975)

- Richard Sharpe Shaver and wife Virginia in January 1944
- Born: October 8, 1907; Berwick, Pennsylvania, U.S
- Died: November 5, 1975 (aged 68); Summit, Arkansas, U.S.
- Spouse(s): Sophie Gurvitch (m. Summer 1934, d. ) Virginia Fenwick (m. Jan 28, 1943; sep. March 28, 1946; div. Nov 1946); Dorothy "Dottie" Bailey, (m. May 11, 1947)
- Children: Evelyn Gurvitch (c. 1935 - Jan 4 2025)

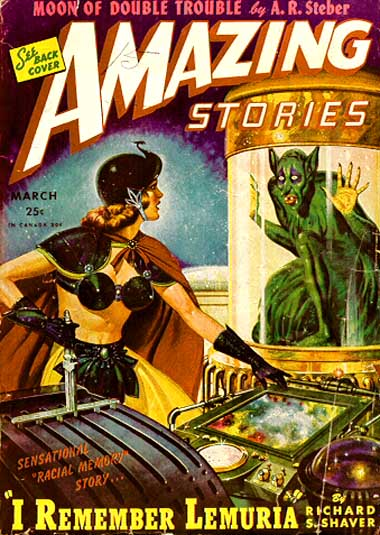
Shaver's first published work, the novella "I Remember Lemuria", was the cover story in the March 1945 Amazing Stories

Richard Sharpe Shaver (October 8, 1907 – November 5, 1975) was an American writer and artist who achieved notoriety in the years following World War II as the author of controversial stories which were printed in science fiction magazines (primarily Amazing Stories). Shaver claimed that he had personal experience of a sinister ancient civilization that harbored fantastic technology in caverns under the earth. The controversy stemmed from the claim by Shaver, and his editor and publisher Ray Palmer, that Shaver's writings, while presented in the guise of fiction, were fundamentally true. Shaver's stories were promoted by Ray Palmer as "The Shaver Mystery".

During the last decades of his life, Shaver devoted himself to "rock books" – stones that he believed had been created by the advanced ancient races and were embedded with legible pictures and texts. He produced paintings allegedly based on the rocks' images and photographed them extensively, as well as writing about them. Posthumously, Shaver has gained a reputation as an artist; his paintings and photos have been exhibited in Los Angeles, New York and elsewhere.

== Early life ==
Richard Sharpe Shaver was born on October 7, 1907, in Virginia to Grace and Ziba Shaver. He had two sisters, Claire and Isabella, and two brothers, Donald and Taylor. The family moved to Berwick, Pennsylvania, when he was a young child.

The family relocated again to Detroit, Michigan, when his older brother Taylor found work there with the Federal Immigration Service. Shaver enrolled in the Wicker School of Fine Art and worked part-time as an art model. At Wicker, he began a relationship with his teacher Sophie Gurvitch. The pair married in Summer 1932, a few weeks after Wicker permanently closed. The two had a daughter, Evelyn, born circa 1935. Shaver found work as a gardener and welder.

In 1934, Shaver's older brother Taylor died from pneumonia, and Shaver's remaining family returned to Pennsylvania.

Shaver was admitted to the Emergency Ward in Detroit complaining of auditory hallucinations or voices talking about him. A doctor there noted that Shaver "gives a definite history of persecution for alleged imaginary communist beliefs and ridicule by his fellow employees for supposed homosexual practices." The doctor noted Shaver believed he had been hypnotized and reported a "dual mental personality" as if his words are uttered by someone else. The doctor noted Shaver was "in general he is able to rid himself to an extent from the ideas of persecution."

After his brother's death, Shaver was committed to the Ypsilanti State Hospital for mental health disorders by his wife, Sophie. He stayed at the hospital for nearly two years, with periodic visits home to Pennsylvania. During his hospitalization, Sophie was accidentally electrocuted by a space heater in her bathroom. Shaver signed custody of his daughter over to his parents. He was released from hospital, returned to his family's farm in Pennsylvania, and soon left to travel across the Northeastern United States and Canada. Shaver was arrested for stowing away on a merchant vessel in Newfoundland in December 1937, and in early 1938 he was deported from Canada and sent to Grafton State Hospital in Massachusetts. He was transferred to the Ionia State Hospital for the Criminally Insane in Michigan later that year, where he remained for five years. He began writing the year he was discharged, in 1943.

In January 1944, newspapers announced Shaver's marriage to Virginia Fenwick of Texas. It was reported that both were fiction authors, with Shaver's "A Warning To Future Man" recently accepted for publication by a popular magazine. In 1946, Shaver advertised for assistance with radio. In October 1946, papers reported that Shaver filed for divorce, alleging that Virginia had deserted him on March 28, 1943 – two months after their wedding. Divorce was granted in November 1946.

== The Shaver Mystery ==
During 1943, Shaver wrote a letter to Amazing Stories magazine. He claimed to have discovered an ancient language he called "Mantong", a sort of Proto-Human language that was the source of all Earthly languages. In Mantong, each sound had a hidden meaning; by applying this formula to any word in any language, one could decode a secret meaning to any word, name or phrase. Editor Ray Palmer applied the Mantong formula to several words, and said he realized Shaver was on to something.

According to Palmer (in his autobiography The Secret World), Palmer wrote back to Shaver, asking how he had learned of Mantong. Shaver responded with an approximately 10,000-word document titled "A Warning to Future Man". Shaver claimed to have worked in a factory where, in 1932, odd things began to occur. As Bruce Lanier Wright notes, Shaver "began to notice that one of the welding guns on his job site, 'by some freak of its coil's field atunements', was allowing him to hear the thoughts of the men working around him. More frighteningly, he then received the telepathic record of a torture session conducted by malevolent entities in caverns deep within the earth." According to Michael Barkun, Shaver offered inconsistent accounts of how he first learned of the hidden cavern world, but that the assembly line story was the "most common version".

Shaver wrote of extremely advanced prehistoric races who had built cavern cities inside the Earth before abandoning Earth for another planet due to damaging radiation from the Sun: an example of a cryptoterrestrial hypothesis. Those ancients also abandoned some of their own offspring here, a minority of whom remained noble and human, "Teros", while most degenerated over time into a population of mentally impaired sadists known as "Deros"—short for "detrimental robots". Shaver's "robots" were not mechanical constructs, but were robot-like due to their savage behavior.

These Deros still lived in the cave cities, according to Shaver, kidnapping surface-dwelling people by the thousands for meat or torture. With the sophisticated "ray" machinery that the great ancient races had left behind, they spied on people and projected tormenting thoughts and voices into our minds (reminiscent of schizophrenia's "influencing machines" such as the air loom). Deros could be blamed for nearly all misfortunes, from minor "accidental" injuries or illnesses to airplane crashes and catastrophic natural disasters. Women especially were singled out for brutal treatment, including rape, and Mike Dash notes that "[s]ado-masochism was one of the prominent themes of Shaver's writings". Though generally confined to their caves, Shaver claimed that the Deros sometimes traveled with spaceships or rockets, and had dealings with equally evil extraterrestrial beings. Shaver claimed to possess first-hand knowledge of the Deros and their caves, insisting he had been their prisoner for several years.

Palmer edited and rewrote the manuscript, increasing the total word count to a novella length of 31,000. Palmer insisted that he did not alter the main elements of Shaver's story, but that he only added an exciting plot so the story would not read "like a dull recitation". Retitled "I Remember Lemuria!"; it was published in the March 1945 issue of Amazing. The issue sold out, and generated quite a response: Between 1945 and 1949, many letters arrived attesting to the truth of Shaver's claims (tens of thousands of letters, according to Palmer). The correspondents claimed that they, too, had heard strange voices or encountered denizens of the Hollow Earth. One of the letters to Amazing Stories was from a woman who claimed to have gone into a deep subbasement of a Paris, France building via a secret elevator. After months of rape and other torture, the woman was freed by a benevolent Tero. Another letter claiming involvement with Deros came from Fred Crisman, later to gain notoriety for his role in the Maury Island Incident and the John F. Kennedy assassination. "Shaver Mystery Club" societies were created in several cities. The controversy gained some notice in the mainstream press at the time, including a mention in a 1951 issue of Life magazine.

Palmer claimed that Amazing Stories magazine had a great increase of circulation because of the Shaver Mystery, and the magazine emphasized the Shaver Mystery for several years. Barkun notes that, by any measure, the Shaver Mystery was successful in increasing sales of Amazing Stories. There was disagreement as to the precise increase in circulation, but Barkun notes that reliable sources reflect an increase in monthly circulation from about 135,000 to 185,000. Palmer would later claim the work invited government scrutiny, saying: "Obviously you would imagine the reaction to [the Shaver Mystery] would be to consider it fiction, so you can imagine my surprise to find that many government agencies felt called upon to investigate it, and to pry very vigorously into my own life and background. As an example, the FBI, the various military secret service agencies, and the CIA were constant callers ... this puzzled me. And interested me!"

From 1945 to 1948, Barkun notes that about 75% of the issues of Amazing Stories featured Shaver Mystery content, sometimes to the near-exclusion of any other topic. Historian Mike Dash declares that "Shaver's tales were amongst the wildest ever spun, even in the pages of the pulp science fiction magazines of the period". He also published in Other Worlds magazine; the first issue featured his story "The Fall of Lemuria".

Shaver, Arnold, and Palmer were photograped together along with Arnold's plane.

Many science fiction fans felt compelled to condemn the Shaver Mystery as "the Shaver Hoax". These fans, already distressed by Palmer's shift away from the literary or hard science fiction of earlier years to often slapdash space operas, organized letter-writing campaigns to try to persuade the publishers of Amazing Stories to cease all Shaver Mystery articles. In fact, Palmer printed a number of critical or skeptical letters sent to Amazing Stories, and he and other contributors occasionally rebutted or replied to such letters in print. As Bruce Lanier Wright notes, "[t]he young Harlan Ellison, later a famously abrasive writer, allegedly badgered [Palmer] into admitting that the Shaver Mystery was a 'publicity grabber'; when the story came out, Palmer angrily responded that this was hardly the same thing as calling it a hoax". Dash writes that the "critics of the 'Shaver Mystery' were quick to point out that its author was suffering from several of the classic symptoms of paranoid schizophrenia, and that many of the letters pouring into Amazing recounting personal experiences that backed up the author's stories patently came from the sorts of people who would otherwise spend their time claiming that they were being persecuted by invisible voices or their neighbor's dog".

During 1948, Amazing Stories ceased all publication of Shaver's stories. Palmer would later claim the magazine was pressured by sinister outside forces to make the change; science fiction fans would credit their boycott and letter-writing campaigns for the change. The magazine's owners said later that the Shaver Mystery had simply run its course and sales were decreasing.

The Shaver Mystery Clubs had surprising longevity: Representatives of a club discussed the Shaver Mystery on John Nebel's popular radio show several times through the late 1950s. Nebel said he thought the discussion was entertaining, but in extant recordings he was also skeptical about the entire subject.

Even after the pulp magazines lost popularity, Palmer continued promoting the Shaver Mystery to a diminishing audience via the periodical The Hidden World. Lanier describes the magazine as "Shaver in the raw" with little of Palmer's editing. Shaver and his wife produced the Shaver Mystery Magazine irregularly for some years.

In 1974, Shaver's stories were being printed in UFO outlet Caveat Emptor.

== Rock books ==
During the 1960s and 1970s, while living in Yellville, Arkansas, Shaver searched for physical evidence of the bygone prehistoric races. He claimed to find it in certain rocks, which he believed were "rock books" that had been created by the great ancients and embedded with legible pictures and texts. For years, he wrote about the rock books, photographed them and made paintings of the images he found in them to demonstrate their historic importance. He even ran a "rock book" lending library through the mail, sending a slice of polished agate with a detailed description of what writings, drawings and photographs he claimed were archived by Atlanteans inside the stone using special laser-like devices.

Shaver never succeeded in generating much attention for his later findings during his lifetime, but there have been exhibits of Shaver's art and photographs in the years since his death. Artist Brian Tucker created an exhibition about Shaver's life and work in 1989 at California Institute of the Arts, and presented Shaver's work again in later years at the Santa Monica Museum of Art and the Guggenheim Gallery of Chapman University in Orange County, California. In 2009, Tucker curated "Mantong and Protong", an exhibition at Pasadena City College which pairs Shaver's work with that of Stanislav Szukalski. Shaver's art has also been exhibited in galleries in New York City and in a traveling exhibition of "outsider photography" called "Create and Be Recognized" that originated at the Yerba Buena Center for the Arts in San Francisco in 2004. In that exhibition, which toured the U.S., Shaver's "rock book" photography was grouped with works by famous "outsider artists", including Henry Darger and Adolf Wolfli.

== Influence and references to the Shaver Mystery ==
After its initial effect on the Amazing Stories readership, the Shaver Mystery continued to influence science fiction and other general literature. Many modern books, films, and games make references to Deros and other aspects of Shaver's story. The Shaver Mystery has also influenced believers of paranormal phenomena. This has taken various forms, from suspected connections between the Deros and UFOs to appearances of the Deros in the mythology of the Church of the SubGenius.

=== Shaver in science fiction, fantasy and horror ===
As noted above, writer Harlan Ellison reportedly thought the Shaver Mystery was nonsense. However, he did use elements of the Shaver Mystery in one of his own science fiction short stories. "From A to Z, in the Chocolate Alphabet" featured 26 brief stories, some a few pages long, others comprising only a few sentences. One story, "The Elevator People", reports that "[t]here are five hundred buildings in the United States whose elevators go deeper than the basement". Those unfortunates who descend to the caverns emerge nearly catatonic after being "treated" by the evil cavern inhabitants.

The 2004 Japanese horror movie Marebito, directed by Takashi Shimizu, also refers to Shaver's work and the Deros. The movie refers to Shaver's books directly, as well as showing Deros at several times during the film. In 2005, Fate Magazine featured a retrospective on Shaver's work.

Richard Shaver and the Deros are mentioned on a plaque in the video game Shivers, next to a sculpture of a Dero in the "Subterranean World" room.

Both Shaver and his work, as well as Amazing Stories, are amongst the esoteric and unusual ideas referred to in the Philip K. Dick novel Confessions of a Crap Artist.

In the role-playing game Dungeons & Dragons, which was heavily influenced by pulp and weird fiction in its development, there exists a race of evil subterranean dwarves called the derro, which were first described in the AD&D First Edition of Monster Manual II. These derro make raids on the surface to kidnap humans for use as slaves and food, and some among them, called Savants, possess magical and psychic powers, which they can use to influence people's minds. They are said to have a main stronghold deep underground where they plot the overthrow of humanity.

Sociologist and occultist Carroll "Poke" Runyon produced a 2007 pseudo-documentary, "Beyond Lemuria," relating subterranean Deros to interdimensional travel. Several of Runyon's "Hermetic Hour" podcasts discuss the Shaver Mysteries.

The novel Tamper, by Bill Ectric, takes its name from Shaver's description of the Deros' ability to tamper with the minds of humans with invisible rays. In the book, a boy obsessed with the "Shaver Mystery" begins to hear strange noises in his parents' basement which may or may not be real.

In 1928, Shaver's future wife Sophie had a work of art, "Night", published in the Detroit Free Press.

=== Shaver and UFOs ===
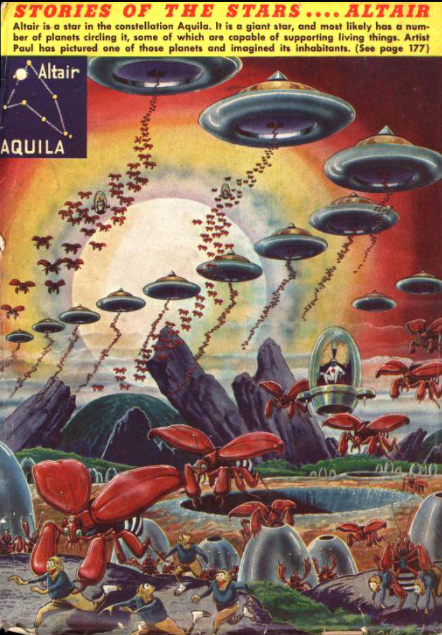
Nearly a year before the flying disc wave of 1947, Amazing Stories featured disc-shaped spacecraft.

In the summer of 1947, Kenneth Arnold claimed to have seen some unusual flying objects near Mount Rainier. His report caused widespread interest in unidentified flying objects, and Palmer was quick to argue that the "flying saucers" were validation of the Shaver Mystery — for several years, he noted, Shaver had mentioned the Deros' supposed spaceships. The idea that Shaver and Palmer had somehow predicted or presaged the "flying saucer" craze was later championed by writer John Keel. His 1983 article "The Man Who Invented Flying Saucers" (first published in Fortean Times) declared that "Palmer assigned artists to make sketches of objects described by readers and disc-shaped flying machines appeared on the covers of his magazine long before June 1947. So we can note that a considerable number of people — millions — were exposed to the flying saucer concept before the national news media were even aware of it. Anyone who glanced at the magazines on a newsstand and caught a glimpse of the saucer-emblazoned Amazing Stories cover had the image implanted in his subconscious".

However, UFO researcher Jerome Clark would argue just the contrary, writing that "[i]t must be stressed that Palmer did not depict the deros' 'rockets' as disc shaped. Nonetheless in later years, some would insist, with more hyperbole than reason, that through Shaver's yarns Palmer 'invented flying saucers'. In fact, Palmer's influence beyond his relatively minuscule audience of science fiction fans and Forteans was nonexistent".

=== Other influences ===
The poet and folklorist Jesse Glass joined Shaver's Atlantean Library in the early 1970s as a young man and briefly corresponded with him. He was intrigued by Shaver's "rock books" with their accompanying descriptions, but noted that sometimes the surfaces of the stones seemed to be treated in some manner. One piece of stone looked like the surface was actually a drawing or rubbing on paper that had been heavily shellacked or somehow glued on. In fact, bits of white paper seemed to be showing through the shellac. Glass corresponded with Shaver and found him to be an intelligent and well-read correspondent until one day, out of the blue, the letters took on an abusive tone. It was then that Glass ended the correspondence.

The artist Jermaine Rogers has often used his version of the Deros in his many posters used to advertise rock music concerts. Rogers has approached the subject of the Deros with an ambiguity that some have taken as proof that he truly believes in these beings. Starting in 1994, Rogers' Dero has appeared in dozens of his posters and art prints and in 2004 it became a designer vinyl toy line.

Some aspects of the QAnon conspiracy theory have also been compared to Shaver's ideas, particularly the theme of sadomasochistic abusive acts taking place in subterranean tunnels with the perpetrators also manipulating events on the surface world.

== Gallery ==
Shaver cover art
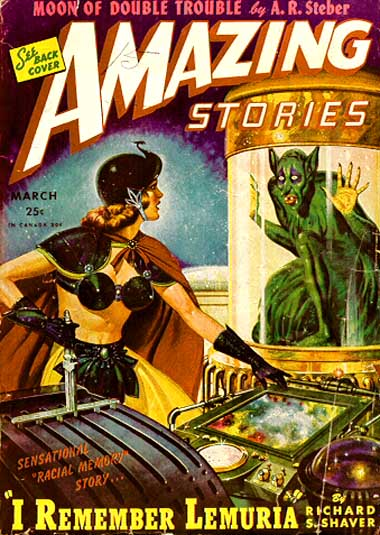
Shaver's first published work, the novella "I Remember Lemuria", was the cover story in the March 1945 Amazing Stories

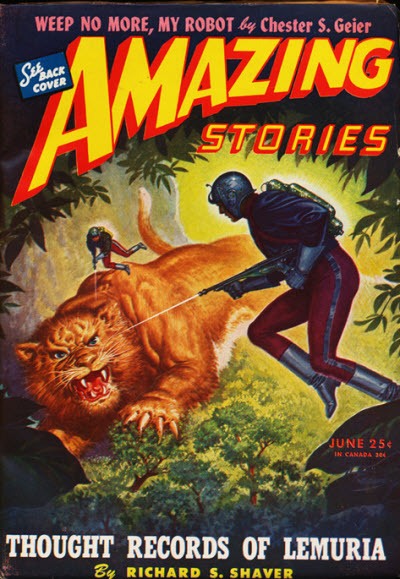
Shaver's novella "Thought Records of Lemuria", his second published story, took the cover of the June 1945 Amazing Stories

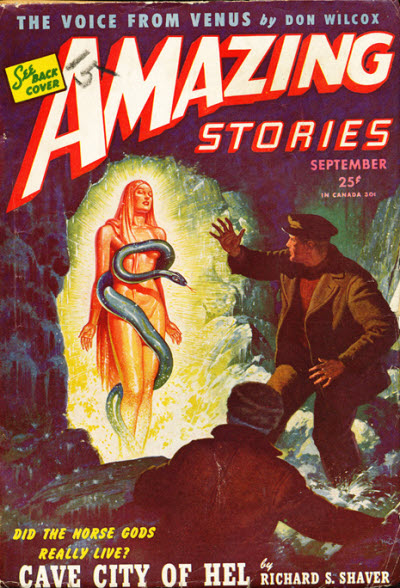
Shaver's run of Amazing cover stories continued in September 1945 with "Cave City of Hel"

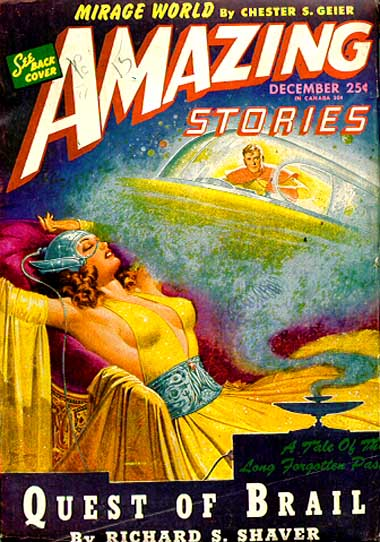
"Quest of Brail" closed out 1945's Amazing Stories, with every issue featuring a Shaver cover painted by Robert Gibson Jones

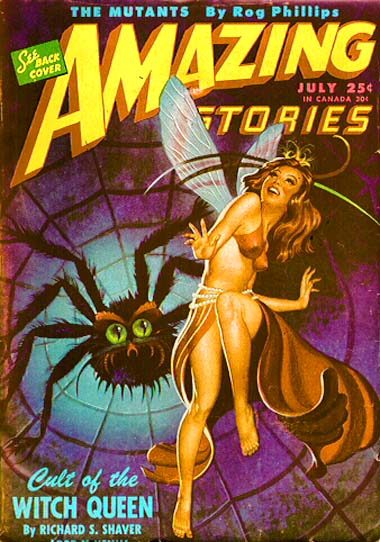
Shaver Mystery stories continued to dominate Amazing's covers in 1946

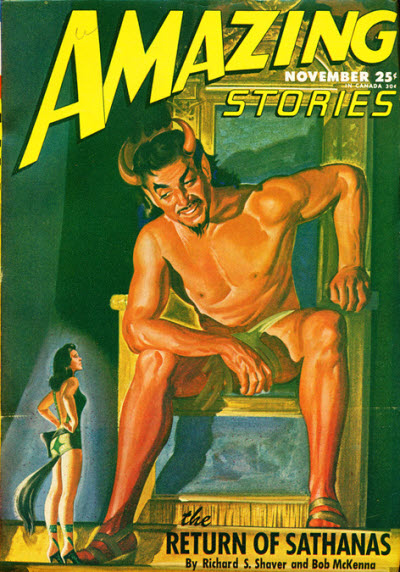
Some of Shaver's stories were written in collaboration with Philadelphia radio personality Bob McKenna

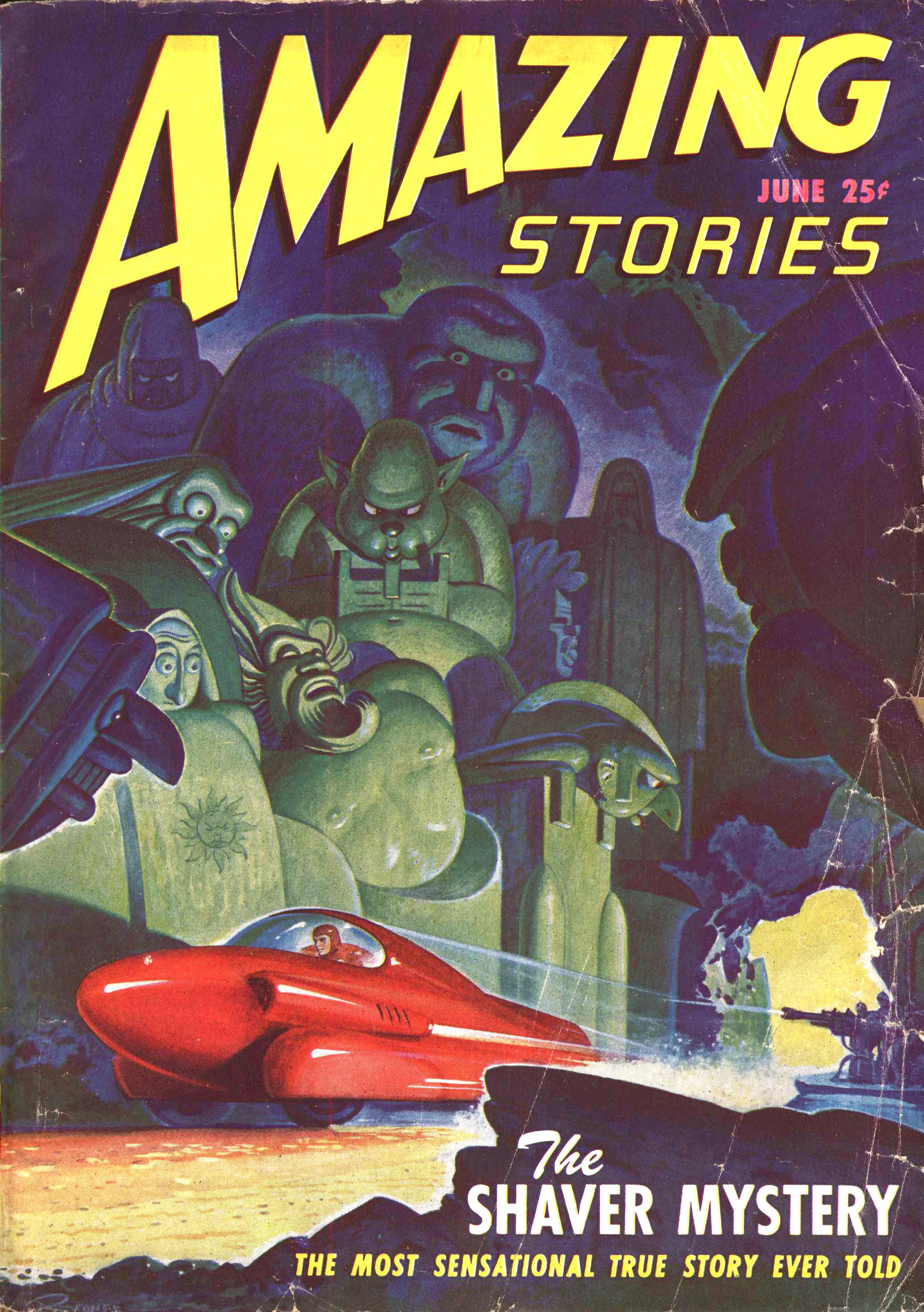
The June 1947 issue of Amazing Stories featured the "Shaver Mystery"

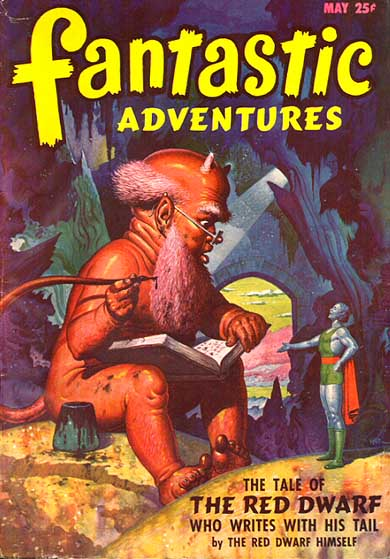
Shaver once wrote under the eccentric pseudonym "The Red Dwarf"

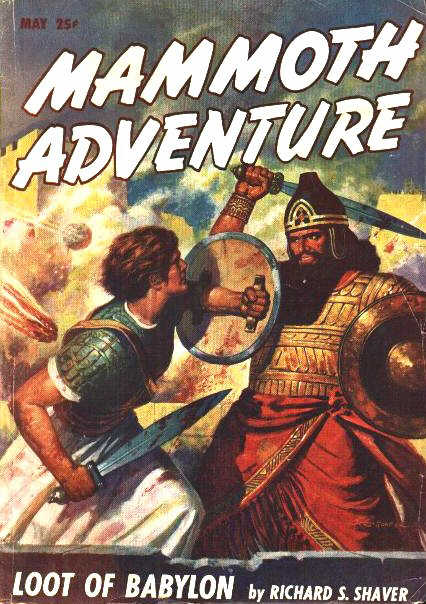
Shaver also wrote more conventional stories for adventure pulps like Mammoth Adventures

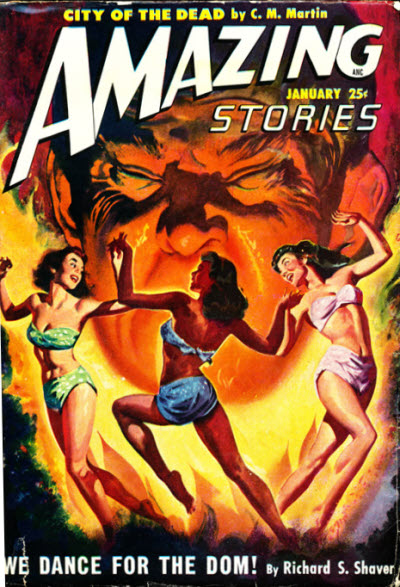
Shaver's stories continued to appear in Amazing after Howard Browne replaced Ray Palmer as editor

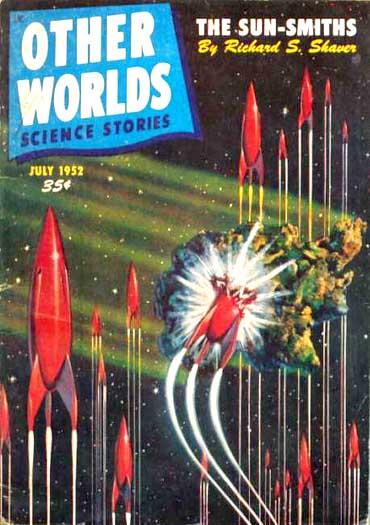
Even after his work fell out of favor with Amazing readers, Ray Palmer continued to publish Shaver in other genre magazines

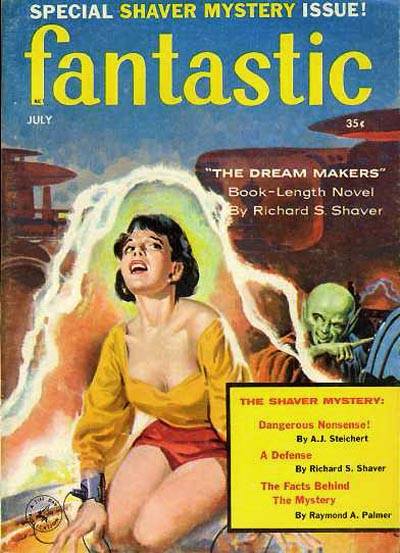
A special issue of Fantastic devoted to the "Shaver Mystery" was published in 1958

== Bibliography ==
=== Short stories ===
- "I Remember Lemuria", Amazing Stories (March 1945)
- "Thought Records of Lemuria", Amazing Stories (June 1945)
- "Cave City of Hel", Amazing Stories (September 1945)
- "Quest of Brail", Amazing Stories (December 1945)
- "Invasion of the Micro-Men", Amazing Stories (February 1946)
- "The Masked World", Amazing Stories (May 1946)
- "Cult of the Witch-Queen", Amazing Stories (July 1946)
- "The Sea People", Amazing Stories (August 1946)
- "Earth Slaves to Space", Amazing Stories (September 1946)
- "The Return of Sathanas", Amazing Stories (November 1946)
- "The Land of Kui", Amazing Stories (December 1946)
- "Joe Dannon Pioneer", Amazing Stories (March 1947)
- "Loot of Babylon", Mammoth Adventure (May 1947)
- "The Tale of the Red Dwarf Who Writes with his Tail", Fantastic Adventures (May 1947)
- "Formula from The Underworld", Amazing Stories (June 1947)
- "Zigor Mephisto's Collection of Mentalia", Amazing Stories (June 1947)
- "Witch's Daughter", Amazing Stories (June 1947)
- "The Red Legion", Amazing Stories (June 1947)
- "Mer-Witch of Ether 18", Amazing Stories (August 1947)
- "Gods of Venus", Amazing Stories (March 1948)
- "When the Moon Bounced", Amazing Stories (May 1949)
- "The Fall of Lemuria", Other Worlds (November 1949)
- "We Dance for the Dom!", Amazing Stories (January 1950)
- "The Sun-Smiths", Other Worlds (July 1952)
- "Beyond the Barrier", Other Worlds (November 1952–February 1953)
- "The Dream Makers", Fantastic (July 1958)

=== Nonfiction ===
- The Secret World (with Ray Palmer) (1975)
- Shaver Mystery Magazine
  - Vol I, No. 1
  - Vol I, No. 2
  - Vol II, No. 1
  - Vol II, No. 2
  - Vol II, No. 3
  - Vol III, No. 1
  - Vol III, No. 2

=== Further reading ===
- Interview (1956) of Shaver and Palmer on the Long John Nebel radio show, 1956
- Recording (March 8, 1958) of Long John Nebel show on Shaver Mystery, Maury Island, and UFOs

== See also ==
- "On the Origin of the 'Influencing Machine' in Schizophrenia", an influential 1919 paper
- Agartha, a legendary kingdom that is said to be located in the Earth's core popular with 19th- and 20th-century occultists theosophists.
- "The Mound" by H. P. Lovecraft from a short description by Zealia Bishop – underground civilization fiction set in the southwestern U.S., part of the Cthulhu Mythos
- The Phantom Empire – film serial with a similar theme that was perhaps an inspiration on Richard Sharpe Shaver's work
- Stanislav Szukalski developed strange theories about Earth being ruled by a race called the Sons of Yeti.
- Deadline (science fiction story), another wartime atomic fiction
- Dark City (1998 film) features humans as captives of a race of mind-controlling strangers.
- Us (2019 film) directed by Jordan Peele depicts a race of subterranean machine-like humans designed to copy their counterparts on the surface.

== Footnotes ==
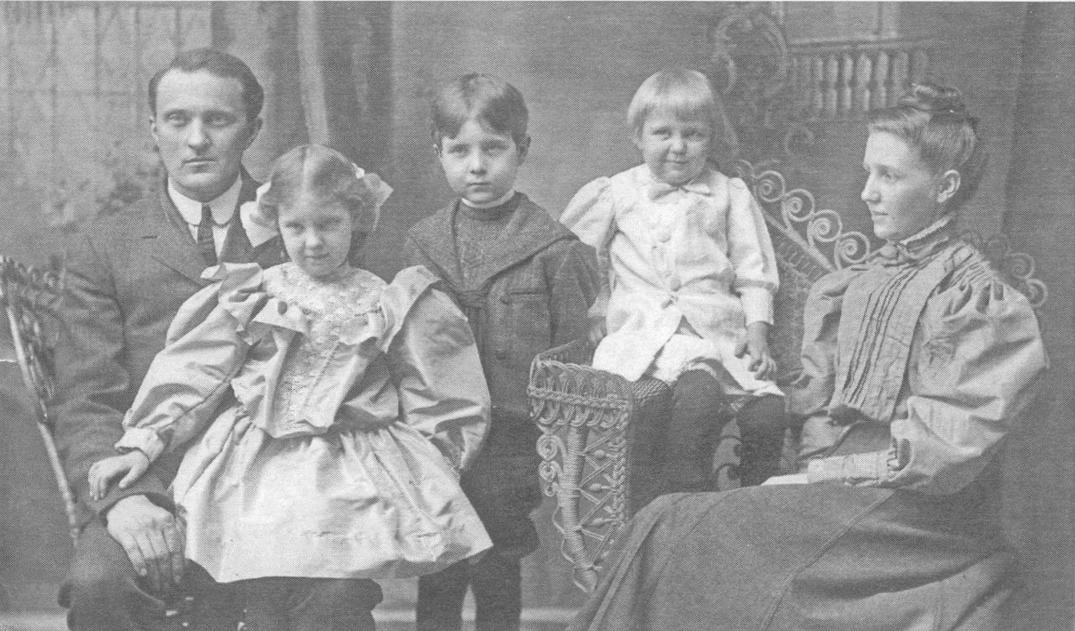
Ziba, Catherine, Donald, Taylor, and Grace Shaver circa 1906. Richard And Isabelle were not yet born
