= Sophie Gurvitch Shaver =

- Gurvitch pictured around 1936
- Born: Sophie Gurvitch; May 1, 1903; Mirgorod, Ukraine, Russian Empire
- Died: December 29, 1936 (aged 33); Detroit, Michigan
- Occupations: painter, instructor
- Spouse: Richard Shaver
- Children: Evelyn Ann Gurvitch (1934–2025)
- Parents: Benjamin Gurvitch (father); Anna Mintz (mother)

Sophie Gurvitch Shaver was a politically-active American painter and art instructor. Described by contemporaries as one of Detroit's "leading artists", her career was cut short by her death from accidental electrocution at age 33.

== Early life ==
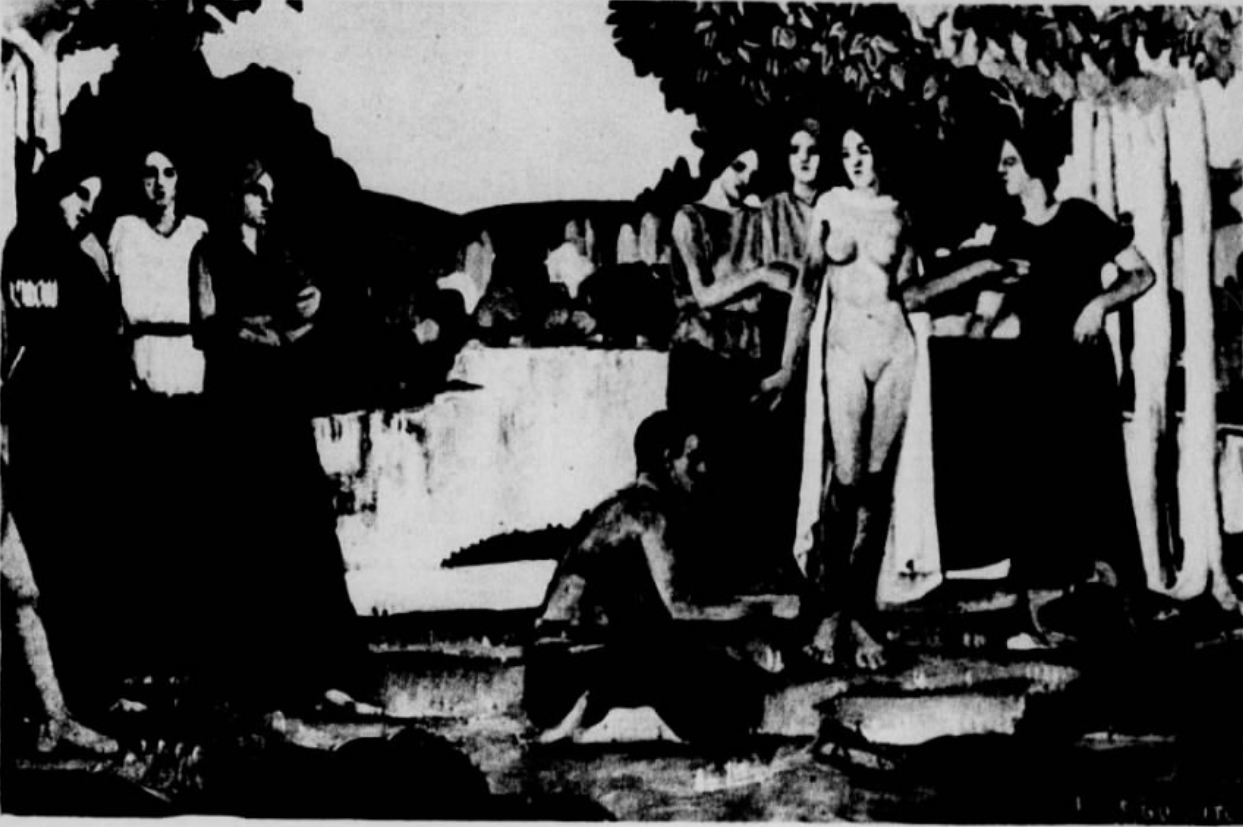
"Diana" by Sophie Gurvitch

Sophie Gurvitch was born on May 1, 1903, in Mirgorod, Ukraine, which was then part of the Russia empire). A family of Russian-Jewish descent, the Gurvitchs fled the pogroms in the Russian Empire, immigrating to the United States in 1904–1905. The family opened a hardware store in Detroit, "Star Hardware and Paint". Sophie and her parents became naturalized citizens in 1911. In 1921, she was enrolled at Southeastern High School in Detroit.

== Involvement in Communism ==
Gurvitch's parents were communists, and she joined the Young Communists. She also belonged to the John Reed Club, a Communist organization of artists and writers. Sophie's daughter would later recall "Mother belonged to the John Reed Club.... Right up until, and during, the Second World War my Aunt Evelyn had people staying over that the U.S. government was interested in. I think they were Communists."

Sophie reportedly was connected to free thought, feminism, and the suffrage movement. She resided at a commune called The Carriage House with like-minded individuals.

== Art career ==
In 1924, she won a prize for her work "Composition: Diana". She was one of several artists at a 1928 Art Show at the Jewish Center. She attended the Wicker School of Fine Art.

Gurvitch later took a teaching job at Wicker School. She also studied at the Chicago Art Institute and at the Art Students League of New York. The Wicker school closed permanently in 1932.

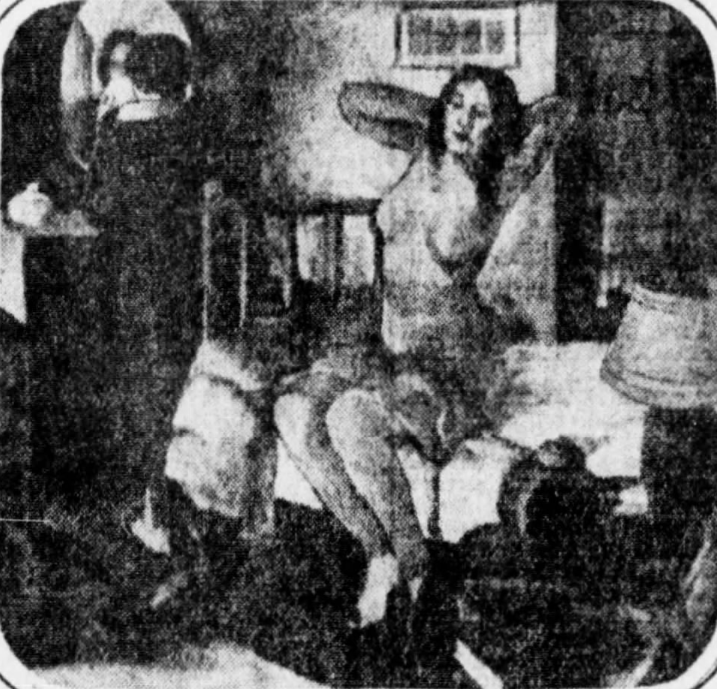
Morning by Sophie Gurvitch

In January, one of her works was featured at the Flint Institute of Arts. In November 1930, 30 of her watercolors were exhibited in Detroit, including "Russian sketches and landscapes".In January 1931, papers advertised an upcoming Gurvitch exhibition at the Detroit Civic Theater featuring watercolors of Russian peasants.In August 1932, her work was exhibited as part of a street fair.

Her work was featured along that of other Jewish artists at the Temple Beth El Social Hall. In April 1933, her watercolor "Gypsies" was exhibited at the Phoenix Club; she announced plans to leave for New York. In August 1933, her work was featured in second street fair. That summer, she was invited along with others of "Detroit's leading artists" to show at the Detroit Institute of Arts.

A 1941 guide to Michigan made mention of her art at a museum, as did a 1965 history.

== Personal life and death ==
Gurvitch was became the first wife of artist and future conspiracy author Richard Shaver when the pair wed on June 29, 1932, in Detroit. Shaver was committed to a mental hospital on August 17, 1934. On August 31, 1934, she gave birth to a daughter, Evelyn Ann Shaver.

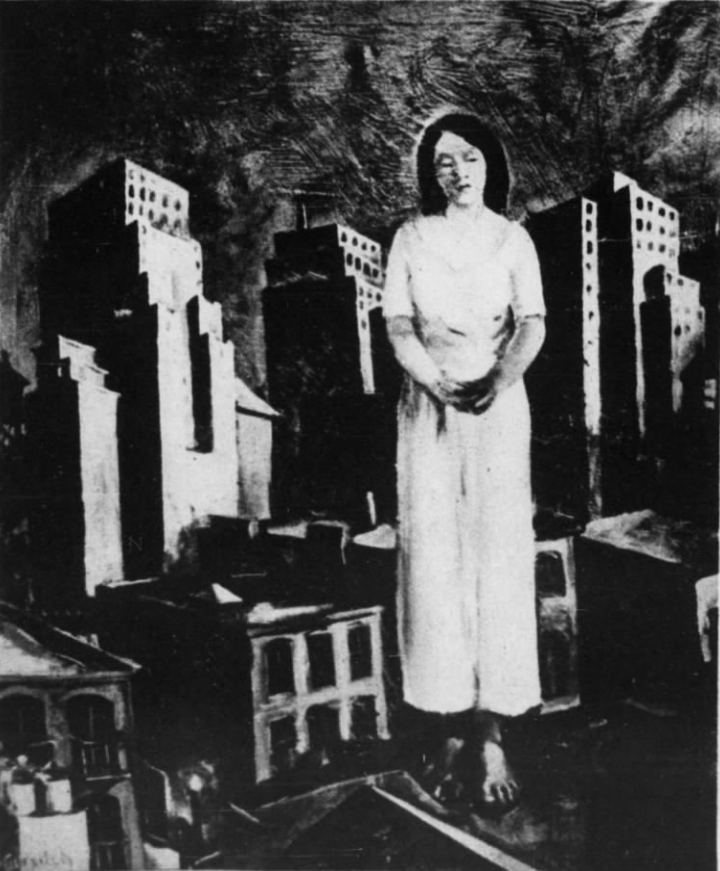
Night by Sophie Gurvitch 1928

On December 29, 1936, Gurvitch was accidentally electrocuted by a space heater in her bathroom while in the bathtub. Papers reported: "An electric heater grasped in one hand, Mrs. Sophie Gurvitch Shaver, one of Detroit’s best-known young artists, was found dead in a half-filled tub at her apartment at 3009 Holcomb Avenue, Tuesday evening. Detective Lawrence Sheehy, of the homicide squad, and Albert Kean, acting deputy coroner, said the young woman apparently lifted the electric heater with damp hands while standing in the water to take a bath and was killed by the current passing through her body. The body was found by [her art clients] Horace Cross and Fred Lister, who investigated when they found the lights on but received no response to their calls."

A memorial exhibition was held in January.
