= You Can Negotiate Anything =

1982 book by Herb Cohen

- Mass market paperback
- Author: Herb Cohen
- Language: English
- Subject: Business
- Published: December 28, 1982 (Random House Publishing Group)
- Publication place: United States
- Pages: 256
- ISBN: 978-0553281095

You Can Negotiate Anything is a self-help book on negotiation by Herb Cohen. Cohen used story-telling to help explain the various concepts and strategies behind the art of negotiation. The 1982 book spent nine months on the New York Times bestseller list.

== See also ==
- Conflict resolution
- Negotiation theory
- List of books about negotiation
