= Long John Nebel =

New York talk radio host (1911–1978)

- Born: June 11, 1911; Chicago, Illinois, U.S.
- Died: April 10, 1978 (aged 66); Manhattan, New York City, U.S.
- Occupation: radio host
- Known for: late night radio show on WOR radio, New York
- Spouse(s): Margaret Dallas (early 1960s); Candy Jones (1972-his death)
- Children: Jackie (daughter)

Long John Nebel (born John Zimmerman; June 11, 1911 – April 10, 1978) was an influential New York City talk radio show host.

From the mid-1950s until his death in 1978, Nebel was a hugely popular all-night radio host, with millions of regular listeners and what American author Donald Bain described as "a fanatically loyal following" to his syndicated program, which dealt mainly with anomalous phenomena, UFOs, and other offbeat topics.

== Life and career ==
=== Youth and young adulthood ===
Nebel was born in Chicago, Illinois, United States. He dropped out of school after the eighth grade, but he was an avid reader throughout his life, and he was conversant on many topics. Rumor had it that he was the son of a physician and ran away with a circus as a youngster.

According to his own account in The Way Out World (1961), Nebel moved to New York City "around 1930", at the age of 19. His first job there was usher in the New York Paramount Theater. Nebel pursued a number of careers in his young adulthood (including a long period as a freelance photographer and a stint as a sidewalk salesman) before establishing the successful Long John's Auctions, an auction and consignment store in New Jersey. At his auction barn in New Jersey, he was billed as "Long John, the gab and gavel man", and people would attend just for an evening's entertainment.

The nickname "Long John Nebel" had several sources: "Long John" was a nickname for his tall, slender build (he stood 6'4" [1.93 m] and never weighed more than about 160 pounds [73 kg]).

Nebel did not seek a career in radio until around 1954, when he was 43 years old.

In 1972, Nebel married the former pin-up model Candy Jones, who became the co-host of his show. Her controversial claims of having been a victim of CIA mind-control influenced the direction of the program during its last six years on the air.

=== WOR ===
In the mid-1950s, radio throughout the United States was floundering and trying to redefine itself after the explosive popularity of television. Over several years, Nebel had many friends at various New York radio stations when he bought commercial time to advertise his auction house. WOR, one of New York's leading stations, faced poor ratings in 1954 when Nebel proposed an interview show. The format, as Donald Bain writes, "would be devoted to discussing strange and unexplained topics".

WOR's management was not especially impressed by Nebel's idea. However, deciding they had little to lose (following WOR's failed foray into broadcasting facsimile editions of the morning paper during the early morning hours), WOR offered him a midnight to 5:30 am time slot, the poorest-rated hours. Building on the modest fame of his auction house (and also hoping to generate more business), he used the same name, Long John, when he went on radio.

To the surprise of WOR's management, Nebel's show was a quick success among New York's night-owls and early risers. Unidentified flying objects were discussed almost daily, alongside topics such as voodoo, witchcraft, parapsychology, hypnotism, conspiracy theories, and ghosts. Perhaps fittingly for an overnight show, one of Nebel's sponsors was No-Doz caffeine pills.

Within a few months Nebel was getting not only high ratings, but press attention from throughout the United States for his distinctive and in many ways unprecedented program (WOR's powerful signal assured that Nebel's show was broadcast to over half of the United States' population). Bain notes that some listeners were put off by his "grating, often vicious manner", but many more adored him because of (or in spite of) his abrasive style. Keith writes: "Though Nebel could be brusque and even imperious in the phone, he was always a sympathetic listener and compasionate host."

==== Seven-second delay ====
WOR was worried about some of Nebel's guests or callers using profanity on the air. Nebel used one of the first broadcast delay systems in radio, giving engineers a chance to edit any unacceptable language before it was broadcast. In 1956, engineer Russell Tinklepaugh invented the system Nebel used. He built a modified Ampex 300 tape deck with an additional set of heads. The deck was able to record on a loop of 1/4-inch tape, and carry the tape around the perimeter of the deck to be played on the second set of heads. This resulted in a delay of several seconds, enough time to hit the "stop" button to avoid airing foul language.

WMCA, which went all-talk in 1970, used a similar system. It involved two Ampex 350 reel-to-reel machines side by side, each with the mounting order of its heads changed from erase-record-play to play-erase-record. Thus the tape loop, transported counter-clockwise, would record the microphone output, and then have to go all the way around to play it back over the air before being erased. When the engineer, producer, or air talent hit the "dump" button the feed would immediately be switched to the other Ampex, so there was very little disruption of the aired sound. Today, of course, such delays are accomplished digitally.

=== WNBC ===
In 1963, WNBC offered Nebel more than $100,000 per year (if not a record sum paid to a radio personality at the time, then very nearly so) to begin broadcasting from the station, and he accepted the offer. He joined WNBC in August 1964, and continued there until 1973, when WNBC, facing sliding ratings, decided to switch to an all rock music format. After a protracted battle with station management, Nebel refused to change the content of his show and resigned from the station in protest. According to Bain, one anonymous station employee insisted that the management at WNBC "deliberately fucked up [Nebel's] career" by spreading unfounded rumors about the format switch and Nebel's reaction to it.

=== WMCA ===
Nebel was quickly hired by WMCA, where, from 1973 to 1977, he continued his program, virtually unchanged from WNBC. The show was still popular, although his ratings on the less powerful WMCA were not as high as they had been at WNBC. At WMCA, John was constantly pestered by prank callers who often told him "Yes John, I'm coming down there, and I'm going to bash your head!"

=== Mutual Broadcasting System ===
Beginning in May, 1977, Nebel's show was broadcast nationwide over the Mutual Broadcasting System, replacing Mutual's national distribution of Herb Jepko's radio talk show. Eight months later, Mutual replaced Nebel with Larry King, in January, 1978.

=== Books ===
Nebel wrote two books that dealt with some of the most interesting of his guests. The Way Out World, published in 1961, covered his years at WOR and included UFO contactees, a stage magician, The Shaver Mystery, Edgar Cayce, and much more, which Nebel said he had gleaned from his "twenty thousand hours of interviewing and research". His second book, The Psychic World Around Us, co-written with Sanford M. Teller and published in 1969, dealt more specifically with tales of the paranormal and the guests whom he had interviewed while at WNBC.

=== Marriage to Candy Jones ===
Nebel had a short-lived marriage in his early adulthood and had a daughter named Jackie from that marriage. In the early 1960s, he was married to Margaret Dallas, but he was single again by 1972 when he married fashion model Candy Jones. She had been one of the most popular pin-up models of the World War II era. The marriage took place after a whirlwind, month-long courtship, although Nebel and Jones had met briefly when Nebel was a photographer decades earlier. Jones became the co-host of Nebel's radio show and continued in this role until his death.

Due to Jones's mood swings, shifts in her personality and some unusual and otherwise-unexplainable events in her life, Nebel said that he had come to suspect she had been a victim of a CIA mind control plot. Her story, with its conspiracy theory overtones, had a definite influence on the content of Nebel's radio program during its final six years.

=== Death ===
Although long plagued with heart disease, he was diagnosed with prostate cancer in 1971. Nebel sought various treatments, but by the mid-1970s, he was in very poor health. He continued broadcasting, however, usually six nights per week, with Candy Jones as his co-host. Nebel died in April 1978 and his Mutual network slot was taken over by Larry King in January of that year. His show on WOR, called "Partyline", was handed to James Randi, skeptic and frequent guest on Nebel's show over the years.

== Format of the show ==
Nebel's program gave the impression of being freewheeling and unpredictable, prone to sidetracks and digressions; very different from the precise, mannered approach of most contemporary radio. There were occasional heated arguments—rather mild when compared to the conflict on more recent programs such as The Jerry Springer Show, but such open conflict in any media was quite startling in the 1950s and 1960s.

Nebel, along with his regular guests and panelists, would interview various personalities and claimants (such as psychic Kuda Bux), and take occasional telephone calls from listeners in the New York area. He would also interview novelists and discuss their books in detail. He was surprised on one occasion by novelist Iris Murdoch's response that she was a frequent listener and had modeled one of her characters after one of his guests.

Nebel's approach was unique: talk radio per se did not yet exist as it would in later decades, and Nebel was navigating largely uncharted territory. Sometimes, Nebel entered the discussions, other times he described himself as a "moderator" and allowed his guests to have spirited debates, commenting only occasionally to guide the debate, or to announce station breaks.

It was not uncommon for Nebel to disappear for 20 minutes or more around 3:00 a.m. and leave his panel of frequent guests to run the show without him. Nebel usually invited callers during the last two hours of the program (from about 3:00 to 5:00 a.m.); up to 40,000 people might try to telephone during this period.

Nebel was perhaps best described as a curious skeptic with respect to the reality of paranormal topics; he frequently characterized himself as a "non-believer". Regarding the claims of the many alleged UFO contactees he interviewed, Nebel stated: "I don't buy any of it." He also noted that he was intrigued by the subject of UFOs, but did not have any firm theories or explanations about UFOs in general.

Some critics attacked Nebel for allowing crackpots free rein on the program, but he responded by saying his was not a traditional news or investigative journalism show, and that it was up to listeners to determine the validity of any guest's claims.

Nebel often asked pointed questions of his guests when he saw logical fallacies or inconsistencies in their stories. He did not suffer fools gladly, unless the fool was exceptionally entertaining. Still, he was rather sympathetic in at least offering guests a forum to state their claims.

When programs dealt with health and exercise, Nebel was fond of saying: "I am a lover, not an athlete." He also popularized the expression "wack-a-ding-hoi" for an idea or guest he believed was a little "crazy". When asked why his television show was no longer on the air, Nebel would respond that he was not good-looking enough to be on television. His friendly, good-humored approach was one of the great reasons for his popularity.

=== Regular guests ===
Jackie Gleason was a frequent guest. On one show, Gleason offered US$100,000 to anyone with physical proof of aliens visiting Earth (Gleason later upped the amount to US$1 million, but it was never claimed). Another memorable show found Gleason undertaking a sharp, occasionally even savage, debate with publisher Gray Barker. Gleason took Gray to task for presenting largely unsubstantiated tales of the Men in Black and contactees as factual.

The two most frequent guests on his radio show were science fiction writers Lester del Rey and Frederik Pohl. Each appeared on more than 400 of Nebel's broadcasts. Nebel also had philosopher Mortimer J. Adler and James Randi on frequently.

=== Sponsors ===
Nebel's sponsors included some unusual products. For example, the KelCo Class Calculator was, according to Nebel, developed by a NASA scientist, who was an occasional guest on his program. Basically a slide rule, the "calculator" was designed to pick horse racing winners.

Nebel's commercials were often as entertaining as the program itself. Nebel was a master story teller who could spin yarns around the virtues of his sponsors. Commercials often ran several minutes. His seven-minute commercial for a pornographic movie ("It Happened in Hollywood") was unforgettable. Apparently, he had not reviewed the copy before reading it cold on the air and he fell victim to uncontrollable fits of laughter throughout his long and fruitless attempt to read it. Another long running sponsor was Ho-Ho's Chinese Restaurant - "Ho means Good, Ho-Ho means Good-Good".

=== UFOs ===
Flying saucers were in the news regularly throughout the 1950s and 1960s and were a frequent topic on Nebel's show. Guests related to this subject included retired Marine Corps Major Donald Keyhoe, contactees George Adamski and George Van Tassel, artist Paulina Peavy, and skeptics like Arthur C. Clarke and Lester del Rey. Nebel discussed the so-called Shaver Mystery, the Flatwoods monster, the Nazca lines, and many other uncommon subjects.

Nebel gave a forum to Otis T. Carr, an Oklahoman who claimed to have discovered the secret of flying saucer propulsion, by studying the works of Nikola Tesla. With some of his regular panelists, Nebel journeyed to Oklahoma City for the unveiling of Carr's saucer. (Carr was later convicted of fraud and jailed after he took several hundred thousand dollars from investors, and never produced his prototype.)

=== Strange occurrences ===
During a Thursday afternoon matinee at New York's Paramount Theatre, Nebel's friend, William Neff, a well-known conjuror, stepped into a spotlight in front of the curtain and began his performance. As Nebel watched, it seemed to him that he could see light through Neff's body, as if he were turning into frosted glass. Slowly, Neff became transparent, then disappeared completely, although his voice could still be heard. After a while, a faint outline like a very fine pencil sketch began to appear. A few minutes later, Neff gradually reappeared looking perfectly normal. The watching theatre audience assumed that the vanishing in front of their very eyes was a part of Neff's act.

As soon as the show was over, Nebel rushed backstage to ask Neff how he had done the vanishing trick. Neff seemed surprised at the question; he was not aware that he had "faded", but he admitted that the same thing had happened three years earlier at a theatre in Chicago. Nebel would later write this story in his book "The Way Out World" and could offer no explanation for it.

=== Pranks ===
Nebel was not above a few pranks, all in the name of showmanship and ratings: On one occasion, for example, he colluded with a friend to offer testimony supporting a guest's claims of astral projection.

Nebel spent weeks on his show developing a tale for his audience that the Empire State Building was rotated on giant ball bearings in the wee hours of the morning. At first Nebel said the motion was almost imperceptible. As the prank developed over time, Nebel began telling callers that if they visited the Empire State Building very late at night, they would find the shops at ground level had switched location to the block around the corner.

Nebel also was fond of telling his audience that the finest candle wicks were grown on "wick farms" located in the Midwest.

The fact that Nebel's second wife, Candy Jones, claimed to have been the subject of Central Intelligence Agency experiments in mind-control was discounted as a prank by those who pointed out his history of promoting hoaxes. Nebel, on the other hand, said that he believed what Jones had revealed to him under hypnosis, and never believed that her story was false in any way.

== Influence ==
Jackie Gleason wrote in his introduction to Bain's biography of Nebel: "Why is [Nebel] so strangely entertaining? ... because the best entertainment is entertainment that opens your mind and tells you the world is bigger than you thought it was."

Radio historian Michael C. Keith wrote: "Few people before or since have brought to all-night radio the kind of ingenuity, originality and variety that Nebel did. He represents one of post-World War II radio's creative high points and another example of the special nature of overnight programming ... He would come to be regarded as one of after-hours radio's true pioneers."

Nebel was a formative influence on talk radio: Donald Bain noted that in the early 1970s, "Fledgling (radio) announcers at broadcasting schools around the country were played tapes of Nebel shows as part of their course study." Recordings of Nebel's shows have circulated among fans of esoterica for decades.

Nebel's format paved the way for later radio hosts, including Art Bell and George Noory of Coast to Coast AM, Hilly Rose, Jeff Rense, and Clyde Lewis, all of whom have broadcast shows on paranormal topics. English actor Colin Bennett called Nebel the Art Bell of his era.
