= WOAI =

WOAI may refer to:

- WOAI (AM), a radio station (1200 AM) licensed to San Antonio, Texas, United States
- WOAI-TV, a television station (channel 28, virtual 4) licensed to San Antonio, Texas, United States
- KAJA (FM), a radio station (97.3 FM) licensed to San Antonio, Texas, United States, which used the call sign WOAI-FM from April 1979 to October 1981
