= Candy Jones =

American fashion model and radio host (1925–1990)

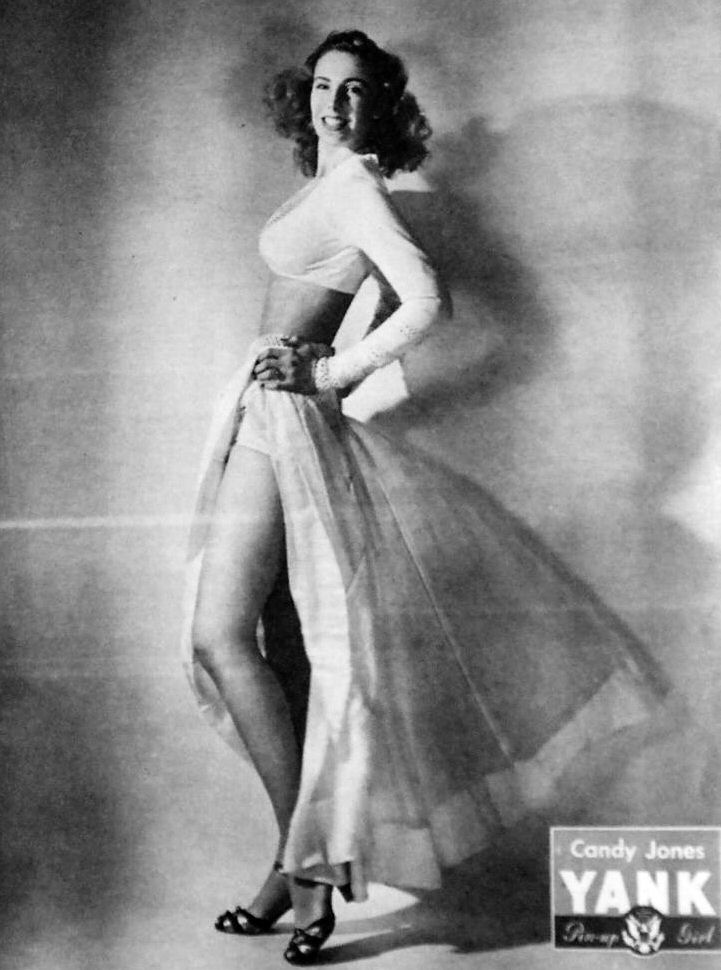
- Jones in Yank magazine, 1945
- Born: December 31, 1925; Wilkes-Barre, Pennsylvania, US
- Died: January 18, 1990 (aged 64); Manhattan, New York, US
- Other name: Jessica Arline Wilcox
- Occupations: pin-up girl, fashion model, author, radio talk show hostess
- Known for: modeling and media work, claimed to be a victim of Project MKULTRA
- Spouses: Harry Conover (m. 1946; div. 1959) Long John Nebel (m. 1972; died 1978)

Candy Jones, born Jessica Arline Wilcox (December 31, 1925 – January 18, 1990), was an American fashion model, writer and radio talk show hostess.

Born in Wilkes-Barre, Pennsylvania, she was raised and educated in Atlantic City, New Jersey.

In the 1940s and 1950s, she was a leading model and pin-up girl, and afterward, established a modeling school and wrote several books on modeling and fashion. In 1972, Jones married her second husband, popular radio show host Long John Nebel, and became the co-host of his all-night talk-show on WMCA in New York City. The show dealt with paranormal, UFO, and conspiracy theory claims.

Jones controversially claimed to be a victim of Project MKULTRA, the CIA mind-control program, in the 1960s.

== Biography ==
=== Early life and career ===
Candy Jones was born to a well-off family. Jones reported vivid, conscious memories of physical abuse by her parents and vague memories of sexual abuse in her youth. She was shuttled among relatives, and her mother, Jones insisted, often kept her cloistered or locked in dark rooms. As a child, Jones said she had an imaginary friend named Arlene to help through her lonely episodes.

Jones grew into an attractive, statuesque young woman, about 6 ft 4 in (1.93 m). Changing her name, she pursued a career as a fashion model. She was a quick success, becoming a runner up for Miss New Jersey in the Miss America contest. Jones was able to parlay this into a hostess job at the main Miss America contest, and a successful career. She was one of the leading pin-up girls of the World War II era: In one month in 1943, she appeared on 11 magazine covers.

During a lengthy United Service Organizations (USO) tour in the Philippines, Jones fell ill in 1945, and was treated by a doctor who was still alive when Candy publicized her mind-control claims; biographer Donald Bain gave this doctor the alias "Gilbert Jensen". According to researcher Martin Cannon, who interviewed Jones before she died in 1990, the "Marshall Burger" alias in Bain's book who worked with Jensen on the Jones case was actually Dr. William S. Kroger, a psychologist at one time associated with UCLA.

=== First marriage ===
In 1946, Jones married fashion czar Harry Conover, one of the first model agents. They had three sons, and Jones says she didn't realize Conover was bisexual until some years into their marriage. She recognized some people might consider this naive, but Jones insisted her abusive childhood had made her wary of intimate relationships, and though she had many suitors, she was sexually inexperienced when she married. She reported that Conover very seldom initiated sexual activities with her, and only when he was intoxicated.

Without notice, Conover disappeared in late 1958. Jones notified police, and Conover's absence made the news. When he returned after a long binge, Jones sued for divorce in 1959. After the divorce, she was left with $36, and considerable debts.

Jones opened a modeling school, and she began appearing regularly on NBC's weekend radio news program Monitor.

=== Second marriage and radio career ===
On December 31, 1972, Jones married radio host Long John Nebel after a one-month courtship; they briefly met decades earlier when Nebel was a photographer. Jones was soon the regular co-host of Nebel's popular overnight radio talk show, which usually discussed various paranormal topics.

=== Mind-control claims ===
Shortly after their marriage, Nebel said he noted that Jones exhibited violent mood swings, and at times, seemed to display a different personality. Nebel called this "The Voice ... a look, a few moments of bitchiness." 'The Voice' usually vanished rather quickly, but the change was so drastic from Jones's usually pleasant demeanor that Nebel was startled and distressed.

Colin Bennett writes,

A few weeks after their marriage, [Jones] did tell Nebel that she had worked for the FBI for some time, adding mysteriously that she might have to go out of town on occasion without giving a reason. This left Nebel wondering whether there was a connection between the 'other' personality within Candy and the strange trips she said she made for the FBI.

Nebel began hypnotizing Jones, and uncovered an alternate personality named "Arlene". Under hypnosis, Jones related a lengthy, elaborate account of her being trained in a CIA mind-control program, often at west coast colleges and universities. Jones and Nebel eventually recorded hundreds of hours of these hypnotic sessions.

Jones said she had some conscious memories of her involvement in the mind-control program: it began in 1960, she said, when an old USO acquaintance (an unnamed retired army general) asked to use Jones' modeling school as a mailing address to receive some letters and packages. Jones agreed, she said, out of a sense of patriotism.

Eventually, said Jones, she was asked to deliver a letter to Oakland, California, on a business trip she had scheduled. Again, Jones reported she agreed, and was surprised to discover the letter was delivered to the same Dr. Jensen who had treated her in the Philippines nearly two decades earlier. Jones said that Jensen and his associate, Dr. "Marshall Burger" (another alias) offered hefty amounts of cash if she was willing to engage in further plans; in their earlier meetings, Jensen had noted that Jones was an ideal subject for hypnosis. Jones agreed, she said, because her modeling school was faltering, and she wanted to keep her sons in their costly private schools.

During hypnosis sessions, an alternate personality called "Arlene" was reportedly groomed by Jensen, so that Jones would have no memory of Arlene's activities. Jones allegedly made trips to locations as far away as Taiwan. While hypnotized, Jones claimed that she was subjected to painful torture in order to test the effectiveness of the alternate personality. Author Bain writes, "[Jones] would be a messenger for the agency in conjunction with her normal business trips."

Again with the USO, Jones visited South Vietnam in 1970; she later suspected her visit had some connection to a disastrous attempt to free American prisoners of war from North Vietnam.

Jones's and Nebel's claims were first made public in 1976 (in Donald Bain's The Control of Candy Jones, published by Playboy Press). Nebel apparently accepted his wife's claims, and openly discussed killing Dr. Jensen in revenge. However, Nebel was a prankster and hoaxer of long standing and as he was not above hoaxing his radio audience, some doubted the recovered memories of Candy Jones's past were genuine.

Several years later, Jones' story gained more notice after the public disclosure of MK-ULTRA in 1977.

Bain reported that associates in Jones' modeling schools asserted that Jones indeed had some puzzling absences – supposed business trips where little or no business seemed to be conducted. Bain also writes that another piece of evidence came forth when "Candy inadvertently held onto a passport of 'Arlene Grant': Candy in a dark wig and dark makeup". Jones says she had no memory of dressing in such an outfit or of posing for a passport in a different name.

Bain also claimed that a tape-recorded message on an answering machine was left on Jones and Nebel's home telephone number on July 3, 1973:

This is Japan Airlines calling on oh-three July at 4.10 p.m. ... Please have Miss Grant call 759-9100 ... she is holding a reservation on Japan Airlines Flight 5 for the sixth of July, Kennedy to Tokyo, with an option on to Taipei. This is per Cynthia that we are calling.

When Jones telephoned the number and asked for Cynthia, she was told that no one of that name worked at the reservations desk.

Additionally, Brian Haughton notes that

There was also a letter [Jones] wrote to her attorney, William Williams, to cover herself in case she died or disappeared suddenly or under unusual circumstances; she told him she was not at liberty to reveal exactly what she was involved in. Bain wrote to Williams who corroborated this fact.

Bain also notes that in 1971, an article by hypnosis expert George Estabrooks was published in Science Digest, wherein Estabrooks openly discussed the successful creation of amnesiac couriers of the type Jones claimed to have been.

Dr. Herbert Spiegel, a nationally recognized hypnosis expert, wrote the foreword to The Control of Candy Jones.

The story of her mind-control claims was featured in an episode of the Science Channel's Dark Matters: Twisted But True in a segment entitled "Sexy Secret Agent".

== Death ==
Jones died of cancer on January 18, 1990, at Lenox Hill Hospital. She was 64 years old and had been living in Manhattan.

== Books by Jones ==
- Make Your Name in Modeling and Television, Harper and Brothers, 1960
- Finishing Touches, Harper & Brothers, 1961
- Between Us Girls Harper and Row, 1966
- Just for Teens , Harper and Row, 1967
- Modeling and Other Glamour Careers, Harper and Row, 1969
- More Than Beauty: A Behind-the-Scenes Look at the Modeling World, Harper and Row, 1970
- Candy Jones' Complete Book of Beauty and Fashion, Harper and Row, 1976

== See also ==
- MKUltra – CIA program involving illegal experimentation on human test subjects (1953–1972)
- Remote viewing – Pseudoscientific concept
