= Foreign policy of the Carter administration =

American foreign policy

The United States foreign policy during the presidency of Jimmy Carter (1977–1981) was dominated by the Cold War, a period of sustained geopolitical tension between the United States and the Soviet Union.

Upon taking office, Carter reoriented U.S. foreign policy towards a new emphasis on human rights, democratic values, nuclear non-proliferation, and global poverty. Carter ended U.S. support for the Somoza regime in Nicaragua and cut back or terminated military aid to Augusto Pinochet of Chile, Ernesto Geisel of Brazil, and Jorge Rafael Videla of Argentina, all of whom he criticized for human rights violations. He negotiated the Torrijos–Carter Treaties, which provided for the return of the Panama Canal to Panama in 1999. In an effort to end the Arab–Israeli conflict, he helped arrange the Camp David Accords between Israel and Egypt. He also became the first U.S. president to visit Sub-Saharan Africa, a reflection of the region's new importance under the Carter administration.

Taking office during a period of relatively warm relations with both China and the Soviet Union, Carter initially continued the conciliatory policies of his predecessors. He normalized relations with China and revoked a defense treaty with Taiwan. He also continued the Strategic Arms Limitation Talks with the Soviet Union, though he continued to criticize the Soviet Union for its human rights policies. After the start of the Soviet–Afghan War, he discarded his conciliatory policies towards the Soviet Union, began a period of military build-up, started a grain embargo, and provided aid to mujahideen rebels in Afghanistan. The final fifteen months of Carter's presidential tenure were marked by several major crises, including the 1979 oil crisis, the Iran hostage crisis, and the subsequent failed Operation Eagle Claw. These crises contributed to Carter's landslide defeat in the 1980 presidential election.

== Leadership ==
=== Appointments ===
Carter's 1977 foreign policy team

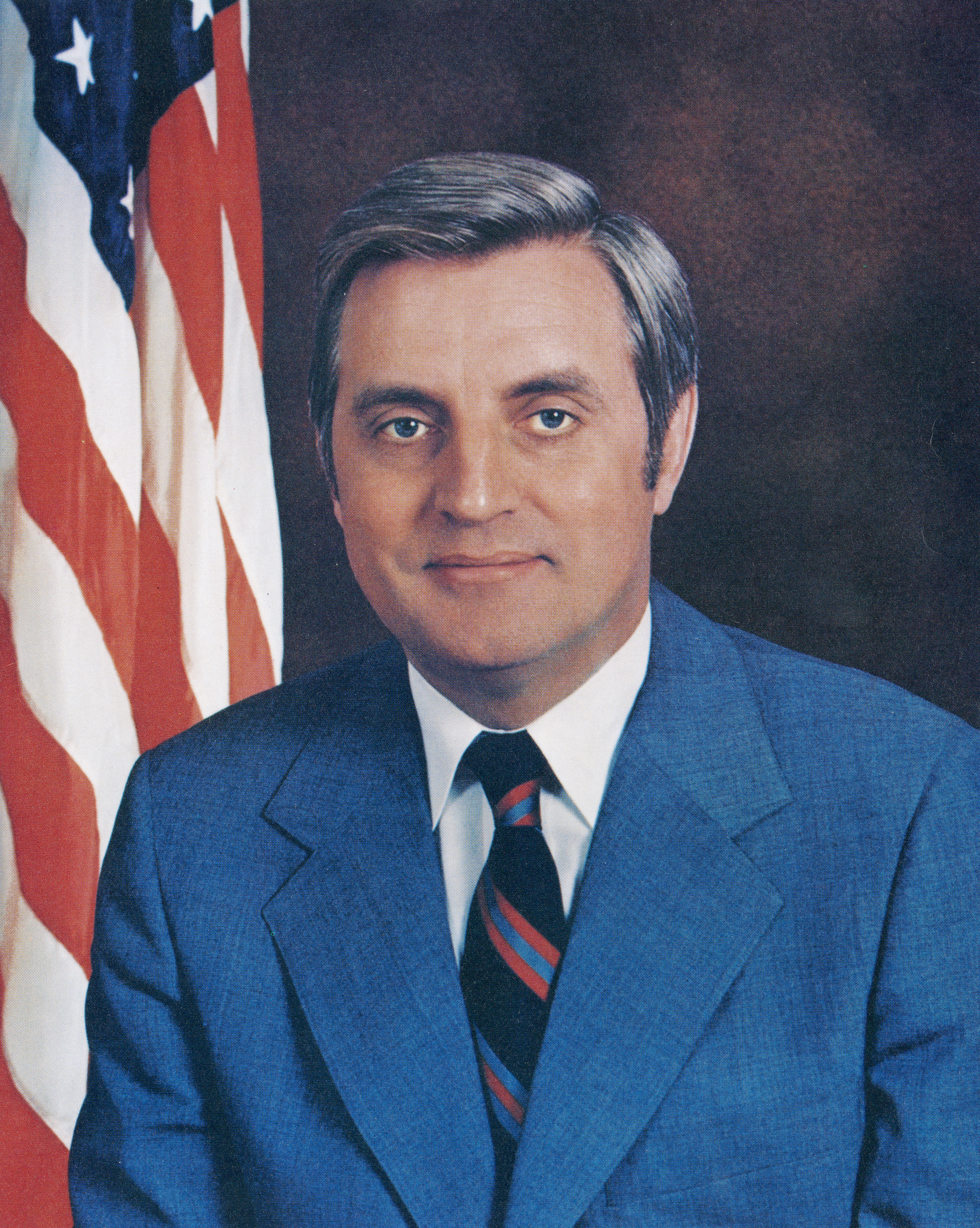
Walter Mondale

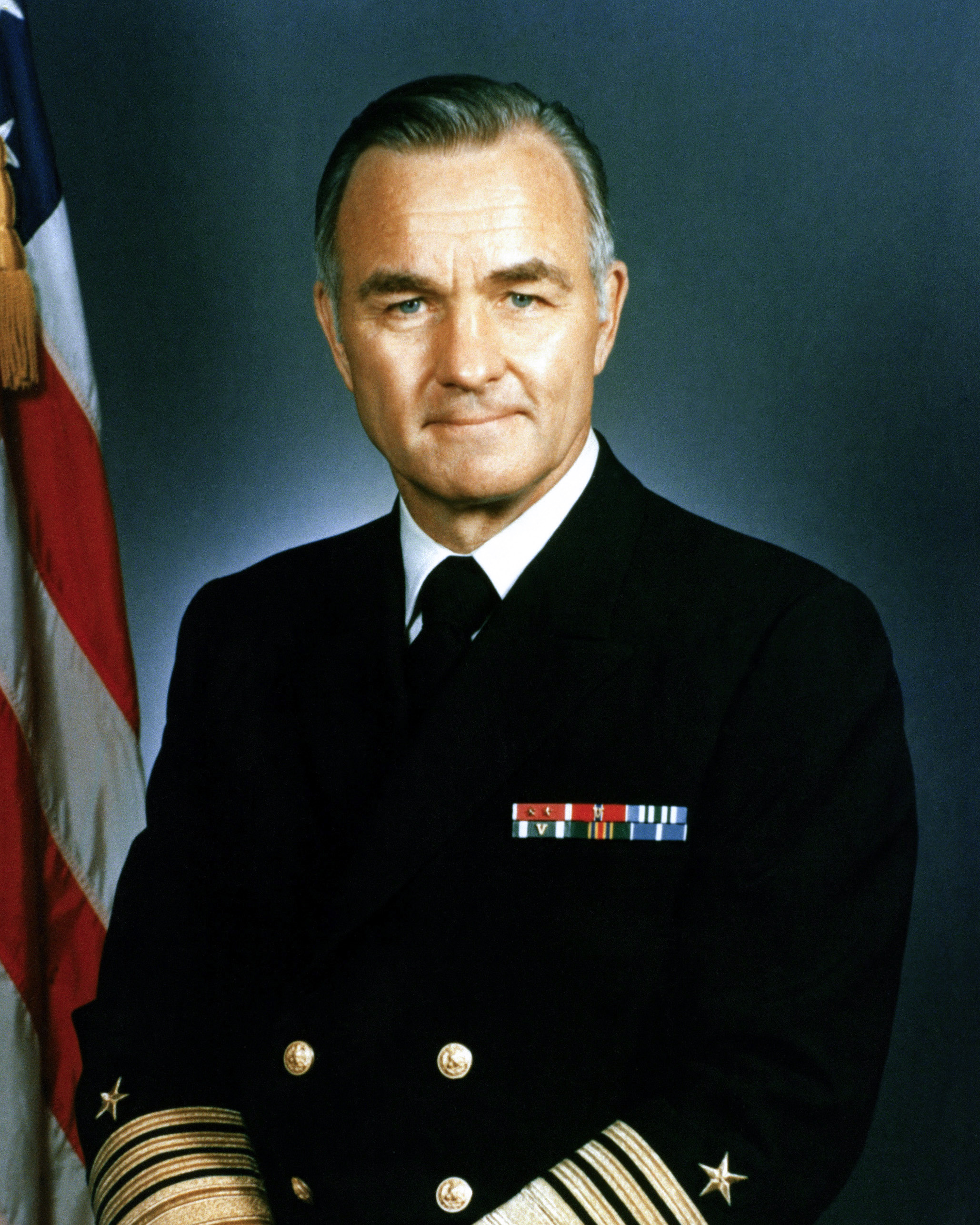
Stansfield Turner

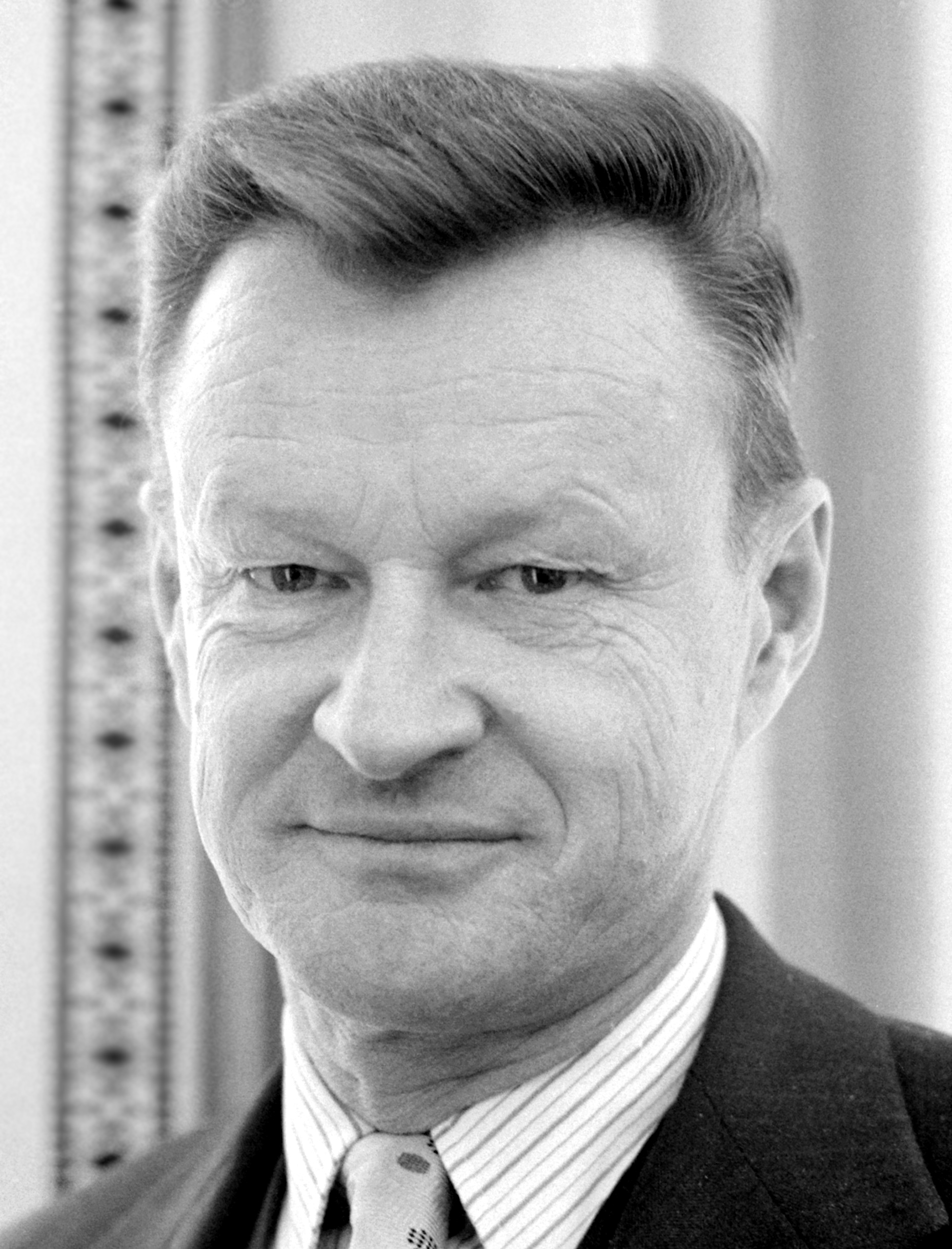
Zbigniew Brzezinski

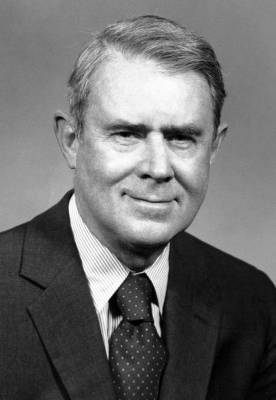
Cyrus Vance

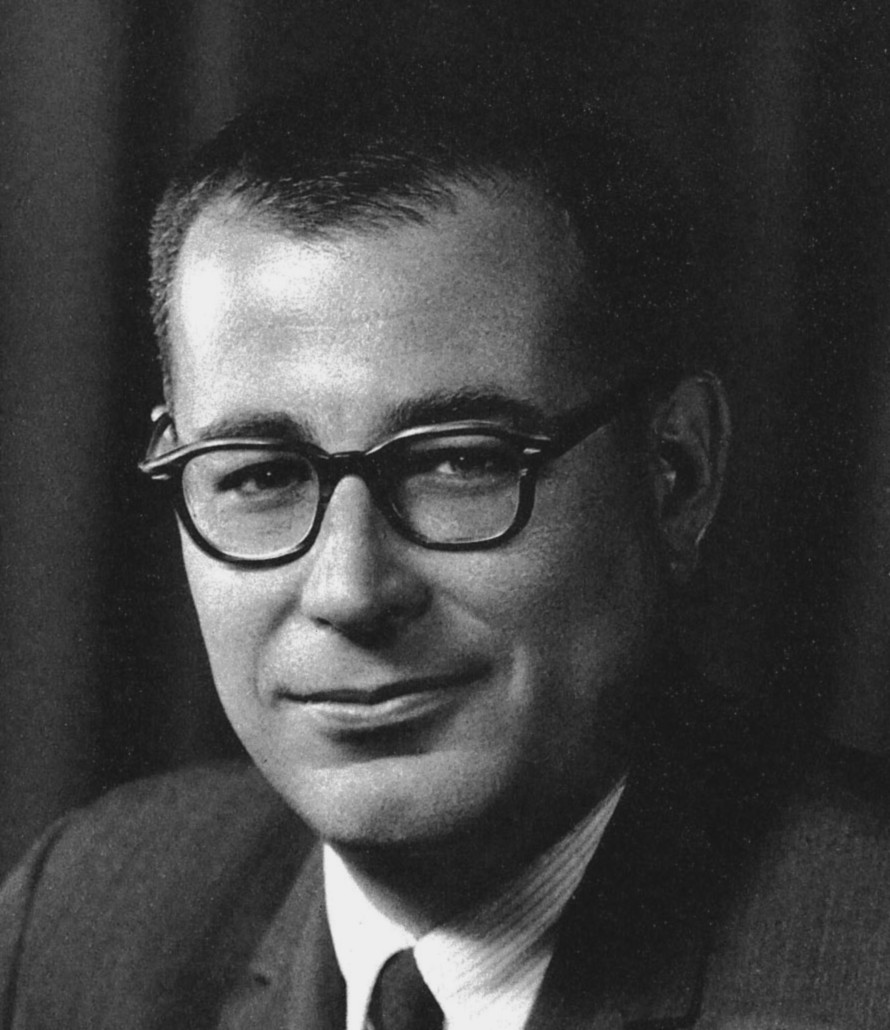
Harold Brown

Carter administration foreign policy personnel
Vice President	Mondale (1977–1981)	
Secretary of State	Vance (1977–1980)	Muskie (1980–1981)
Secretary of Defense	Brown (1977–1981)	
Ambassador to the United Nations	Young (1977–1979)	McHenry (1979–1981)
Director of Central Intelligence	Turner (1977–1981)	
Assistant to the President for National Security Affairs	Brzezinski (1977–1981)	
Deputy Assistant to the President for National Security Affairs	Aaron (1977–1981)	
Trade Representative	Strauss (1977–1979)	Askew (1979–1981)

For the positions of Secretary of State and Secretary of Defense, Carter selected Cyrus Vance and Harold Brown, both of whom had been high-ranking officials in the Kennedy and Johnson administrations. National Security Adviser Zbigniew Brzezinski emerged as one of Carter's closest advisers, and Carter made use of both the National Security Council and Vance's State Department in developing and implementing foreign policy. Vice President Walter Mondale also served as a key adviser on foreign policy issues.

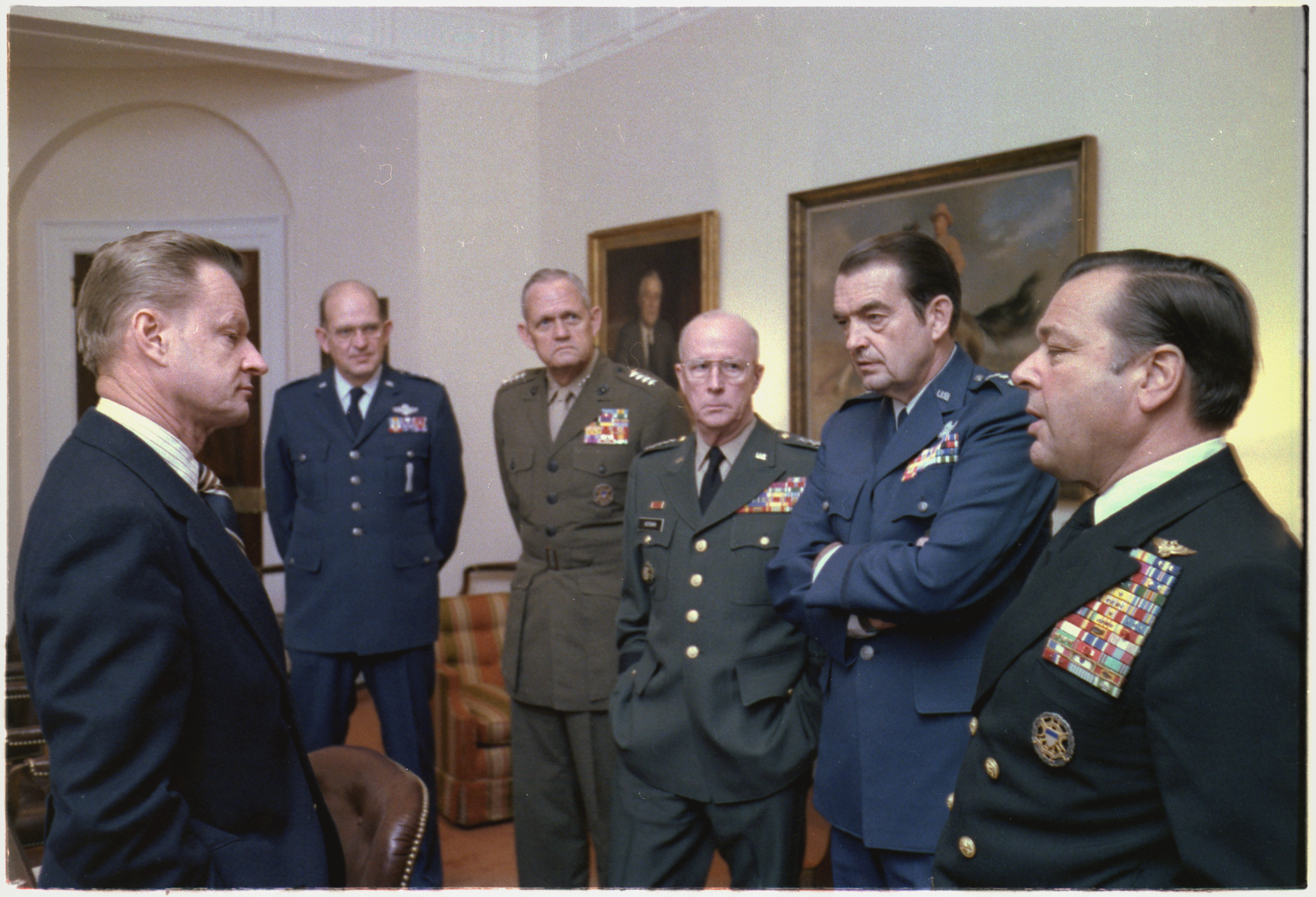
Zbigniew Brzezinski with the Joint Chiefs of Staff, May 10, 1978

Vance pushed for détente with the Soviet Union, and clashed frequently with the hawkish Brzezinski. Vance tried to advance arms limitations by working on the SALT II agreement with the Soviet Union, which he saw as the central diplomatic issue of the time, but Brzezinski lobbied for a tougher, more assertive policy vis-à-vis the Soviets. He argued for strong condemnation of Soviet activity in Africa and in the Third World as well as successfully lobbying for normalized relations with the China in 1978. As Brzezinski took control of the negotiations with Beijing, Vance was marginalized and his influence began to wane. When revolution erupted in Iran in late 1978, the two were divided on how to support the United States' ally the Shah of Iran. Vance argued in favor of reforms while Brzezinski urged him to crack down – the 'iron fist' approach. Unable to receive a direct course of action from Carter, the mixed messages that the shah received from Vance and Brzezinski contributed to his confusion and indecision as he fled Iran in January 1979 and his regime collapsed. After Vance resigned in 1980, Carter appointed Edmund Muskie, a well-respected senator with whom Carter had developed friendly relations, to serve as Secretary of State.

== Cold War ==
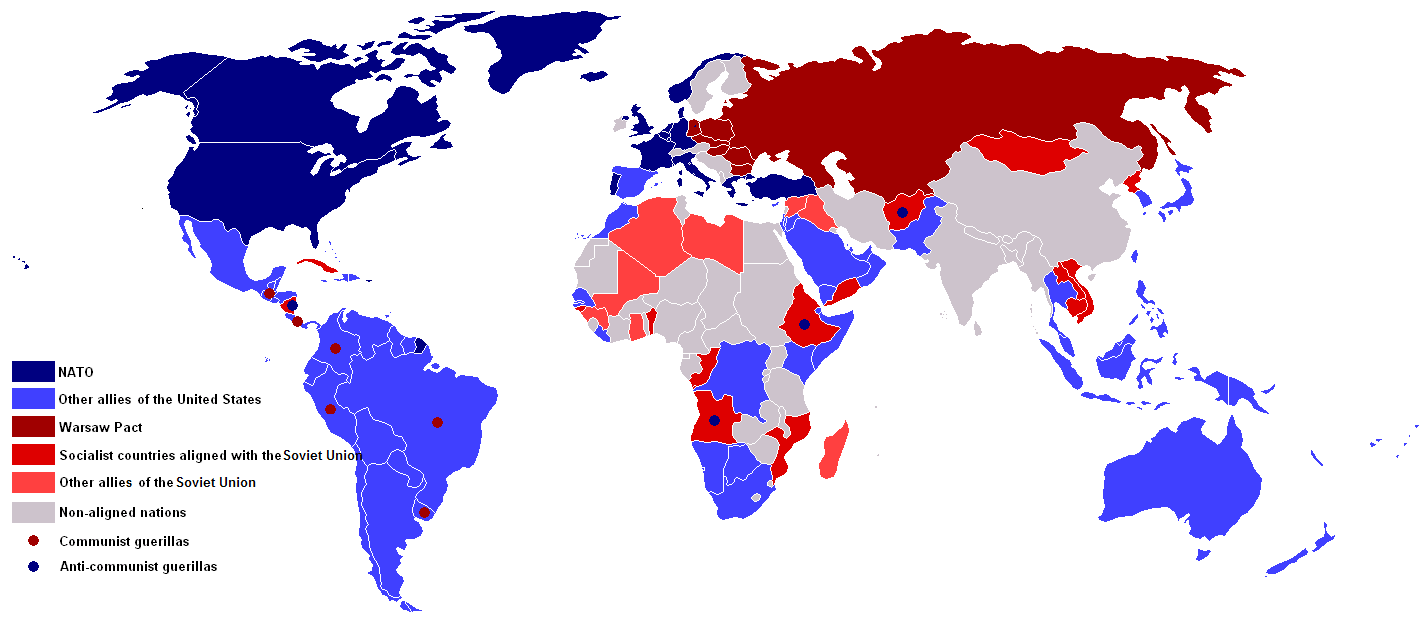
A map of the geopolitical situation in 1980

Carter took office during the Cold War, a sustained period of geopolitical tension between the United States and the Soviet Union. During the late 1960s and early 1970s, relations between the two superpowers had improved through a policy known as detente. In a reflection of the waning importance of the Cold War, some of Carter's contemporaries labeled him as the first post-Cold War president, but relations with the Soviet Union would continue to be an important factor in American foreign policy in the late 1970s and the 1980s. Many of the leading officials in the Carter administration, including Carter himself, were members of the Trilateral Commission, which de-emphasized the Cold War. The Trilateral Commission instead advocated a foreign policy focused on aid to Third World countries and improved relations with Western Europe and Japan. The central tension of the Carter administration's foreign policy was reflected in the division between Secretary of State Cyrus Vance, who sought improved relations with the Soviet Union and the Third World, and National Security Adviser Zbigniew Brzezinski, who favored confrontation with the Soviet Union on a range of issues.

=== Human rights ===
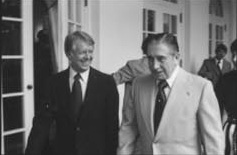
Carter meeting with Chilean dictator Augusto Pinochet, in Washington, D.C., September 6, 1977

Carter believed that previous administrations had erred in allowing the Cold War concerns and realpolitik to dominate foreign policy. His administration placed a new emphasis on human rights, democratic values, nuclear proliferation, and global poverty. The Carter administration's human rights emphasis was part of a broader, worldwide focus on human rights in the 1970s, as non-governmental organizations such as Amnesty International and Human Rights Watch became increasingly prominent. Carter nominated civil rights activist Patricia M. Derian as Coordinator for Human Rights and Humanitarian Affairs, and in August 1977, had the post elevated to that of Assistant Secretary of State. Derian established the United States' Country Reports on Human Rights Practices, published annually since 1977. Latin America was central to Carter's new focus on human rights. The Carter administration ended support to the historically U.S.-backed Somoza regime in Nicaragua and directed aid to the new Sandinista National Liberation Front government that assumed power after Somoza's overthrow. Carter also cut back or terminated military aid to Augusto Pinochet of Chile, Ernesto Geisel of Brazil, and Jorge Rafael Videla of Argentina, all of whom he criticized for human rights violations.

Carter's ambassador to the United Nations, Andrew Young, was the first African-American to hold a high-level diplomatic post. Along with Carter, he sought to change U.S. policy towards Africa, emphasizing human rights concerns over Cold War issues. In 1978, Carter became the first sitting president to make an official state visit to Sub-Saharan Africa, a reflection of the region's new importance under the Carter administration's foreign policy. Unlike his predecessors, Carter took a strong stance against white minority rule in Rhodesia and South Africa. With Carter's support, the United Nations passed Resolution 418, which placed an arms embargo on South Africa. Carter won the repeal of the Byrd Amendment, which had undercut international sanctions on the Rhodesian government of Ian Smith. He also pressured Smith to hold elections, leading to the 1979 Rhodesia elections and the eventual creation of Zimbabwe.

The more assertive human rights policy championed by Derian and State Department Policy Planning Director Anthony Lake was somewhat blunted by the opposition of Brzezinski. Policy disputes reached their most contentious point during the 1979 fall of Pol Pot's genocidal regime of Democratic Kampuchea following the Vietnamese invasion of Cambodia, when Brzezinski prevailed in having the administration refuse to recognize the new Cambodian government due to its support by the Soviet Union. Despite human rights concerns, Carter continued U.S. support for Joseph Mobutu of Zaire, who defeated Angolan-backed insurgents in conflicts known as Shaba I and Shaba II. His administration also generally refrained from criticizing human rights abuses in the Philippines, Indonesia, South Korea, Iran, Egypt, Saudi Arabia, and North Yemen.

=== Defense policy and missiles ===
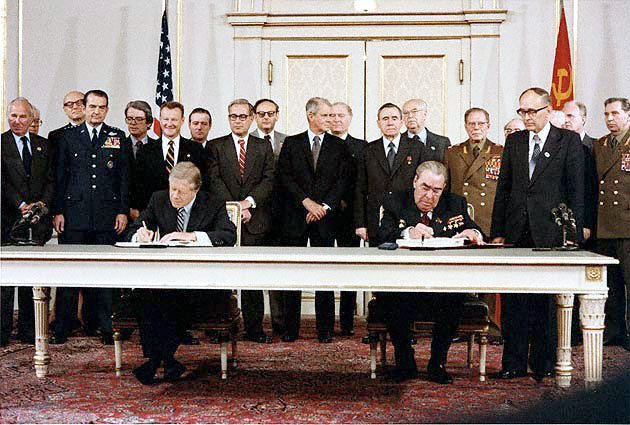
President Jimmy Carter and Soviet general secretary Leonid Brezhnev sign the Strategic Arms Limitation Talks (SALT II) treaty, June 18, 1979, in Vienna

Although his campaign platform in 1976 called for a reduction in defense spending, Carter called for a 3 percent increase in the defense budget. He sought a sturdier defense posture by stationing medium range nuclear missiles in Europe aimed at the Soviet Union. Carter and Brown worked to keep the balance with the Soviets in strategic weapons by improving land-based ICBMs, by equipping strategic bombers with cruise missiles and by deploying far more submarine-launched missiles tipped with MIRVs, or multiple warheads that could hit multiple targets. They continued development of the MX missile and modernization of NATO's Long-Range Theater Nuclear Force.

In March 1976, the Soviet Union first deployed the SS-20 Saber (also known as the RSD-10) in its European territories, a mobile, concealable intermediate-range ballistic missile (IRBM) with a multiple independently targetable reentry vehicle (MIRV) containing three nuclear 150-kiloton warheads. The SS-20 replaced aging Soviet systems of the SS-4 Sandal and SS-5 Skean, which were seen to pose a limited threat to Western Europe due to their poor accuracy, limited payload (one warhead), lengthy preparation time, difficulty in being concealed, and immobility (thus exposing them to pre-emptive NATO strikes ahead of a planned attack). Whereas the SS-4 and SS-5 were seen as defensive weapons, the SS-20 was seen as a potential offensive system. Washington initially considered its strategic nuclear weapons and nuclear-capable aircraft to be adequate counters to the SS-20 and a sufficient deterrent against Soviet aggression. In 1977, however, Chancellor Helmut Schmidt of West Germany argued in a speech that a Western response to the SS-20 deployment should be explored, a call which was echoed by NATO, given a perceived Western disadvantage in European nuclear forces.

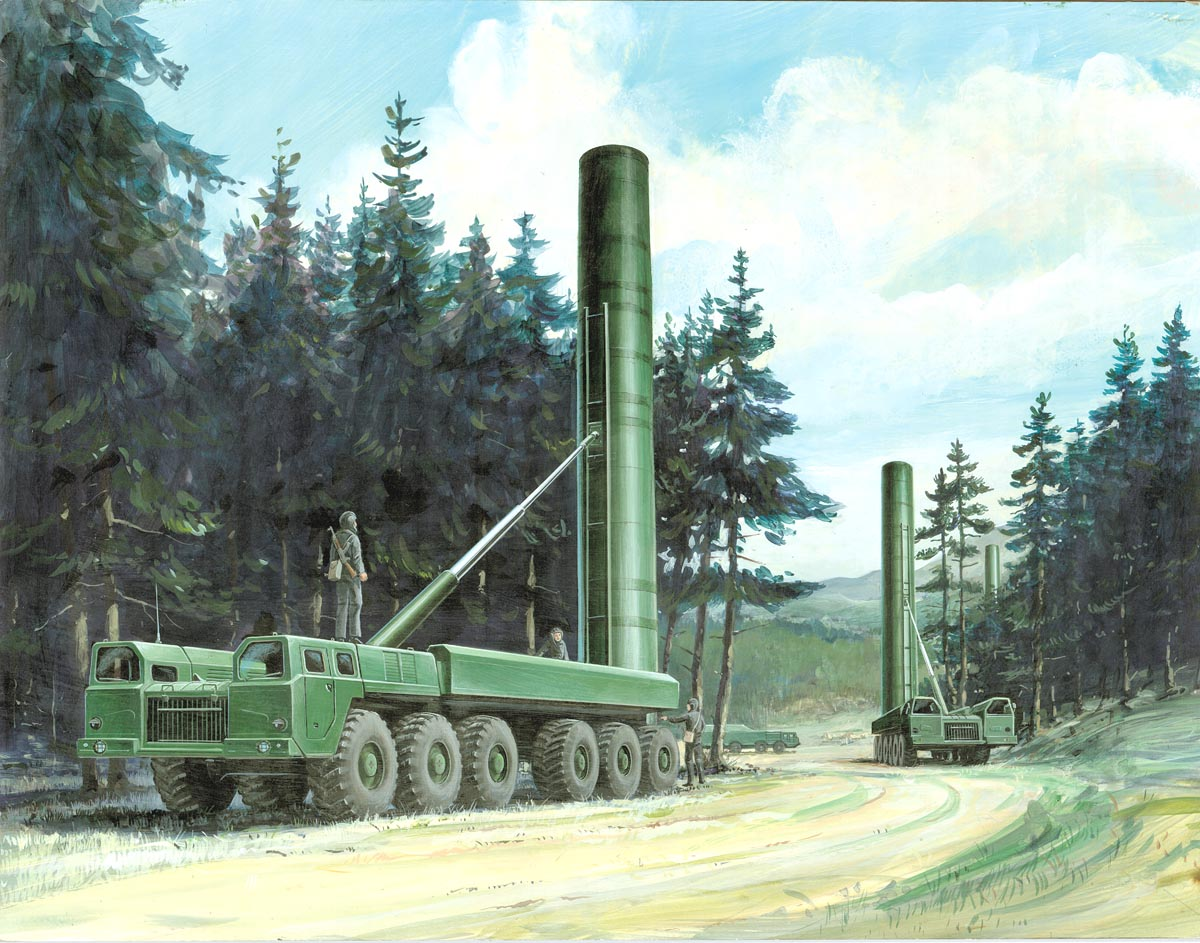
SS-20 launchers

On 12 December 1979, following European pressure for a response to the SS-20, Western foreign and defense ministers made the NATO Double-Track Decision. They argued that the Warsaw Pact had "developed a large and growing capability in nuclear systems that directly threaten Western Europe": "theater" nuclear systems (i.e., tactical nuclear weapons. In describing this "aggravated" situation, the ministers made direct reference to the SS-20 featuring "significant improvements over previous systems in providing greater accuracy, more mobility, and greater range, as well as having multiple warheads". The ministers also attributed the altered situation to the deployment of the Soviet Tupolev Tu-22M strategic bomber, which they believed to display "much greater performance" than its predecessors. Furthermore, the ministers expressed concern that the Soviet Union had gained an advantage over NATO in "Long-Range Theater Nuclear Forces" (LRTNF), and also significantly increased short-range theater nuclear capacity. To address these developments, the ministers adopted two policy "tracks". One thousand theater nuclear warheads, out of 7,400 such warheads, would be removed from Europe and the US would pursue bilateral negotiations with the Soviet Union intended to limit theater nuclear forces. Should these negotiations fail, NATO would modernize its own LRTNF, or intermediate-range nuclear forces (INF), by replacing US Pershing 1a missiles with 108 Pershing II launchers in West Germany and deploying 464 BGM-109G Ground Launched Cruise Missiles (GLCMs) to Belgium, Italy, the Netherlands, and the United Kingdom beginning in December 1983.

Ford and Nixon had sought to reach agreement on a second round of the Strategic Arms Limitation Talks (SALT), which had set upper limits on the number of nuclear weapons possessed by both the United States and the Soviet Union. Carter hoped to extend these talks by reaching an agreement to reduce, rather than merely set upper limits on, the nuclear arsenals of both countries. At the same time, he criticized the Soviet Union's record with regard to human rights, partly because he believed the public would not support negotiations with the Soviets if the president seemed too willing to accommodate the Soviets. Carter and Soviet Leader Leonid Brezhnev reached an agreement in June 1979 in the form of SALT II, but Carter's waning popularity and the opposition of Republicans and neoconservative Democrats made ratification difficult. The Soviet invasion of Afghanistan ended detente and reopened the Cold War, while ending talk of ratifying SALT II.

=== Afghanistan ===
Afghanistan had been non-aligned during the early stages of the Cold War. In 1978, Communists under the leadership of Nur Muhammad Taraki seized power. The new regime—which was divided between Taraki's extremist Khalq faction and the more moderate Parcham—signed a treaty of friendship with the Soviet Union in December 1978. Taraki's efforts to improve secular education and redistribute land were accompanied by mass executions and political oppression unprecedented in Afghan history, igniting a revolt by Afghan mujahideen rebels. Following a general uprising in April 1979, Taraki was deposed by Khalq rival Hafizullah Amin in September. Soviet leaders feared that an Islamist government in Afghanistan would threaten the control of Soviet Central Asia, and, as the unrest continued, they deployed 30,000 soldiers to the Soviet–Afghan border. Historian George C. Herring states Carter and Brzezinski both saw Afghanistan as a potential "trap" that could expend Soviet resources in a fruitless war, and the U.S. began sending aid to the mujahideen rebels in mid-1979. However, a 2020 review of declassified U.S. documents by Conor Tobin in the journal Diplomatic History found that "a Soviet military intervention was neither sought nor desired by the Carter administration ... The small-scale covert program that developed in response to the increasing Soviet influence was part of a contingency plan if the Soviets did intervene militarily, as Washington would be in a better position to make it difficult for them to consolidate their position, but not designed to induce an intervention." By December, Amin's government had lost control of much of the country, prompting the Soviet Union to invade Afghanistan, execute Amin, and install Parcham leader Babrak Karmal as president.

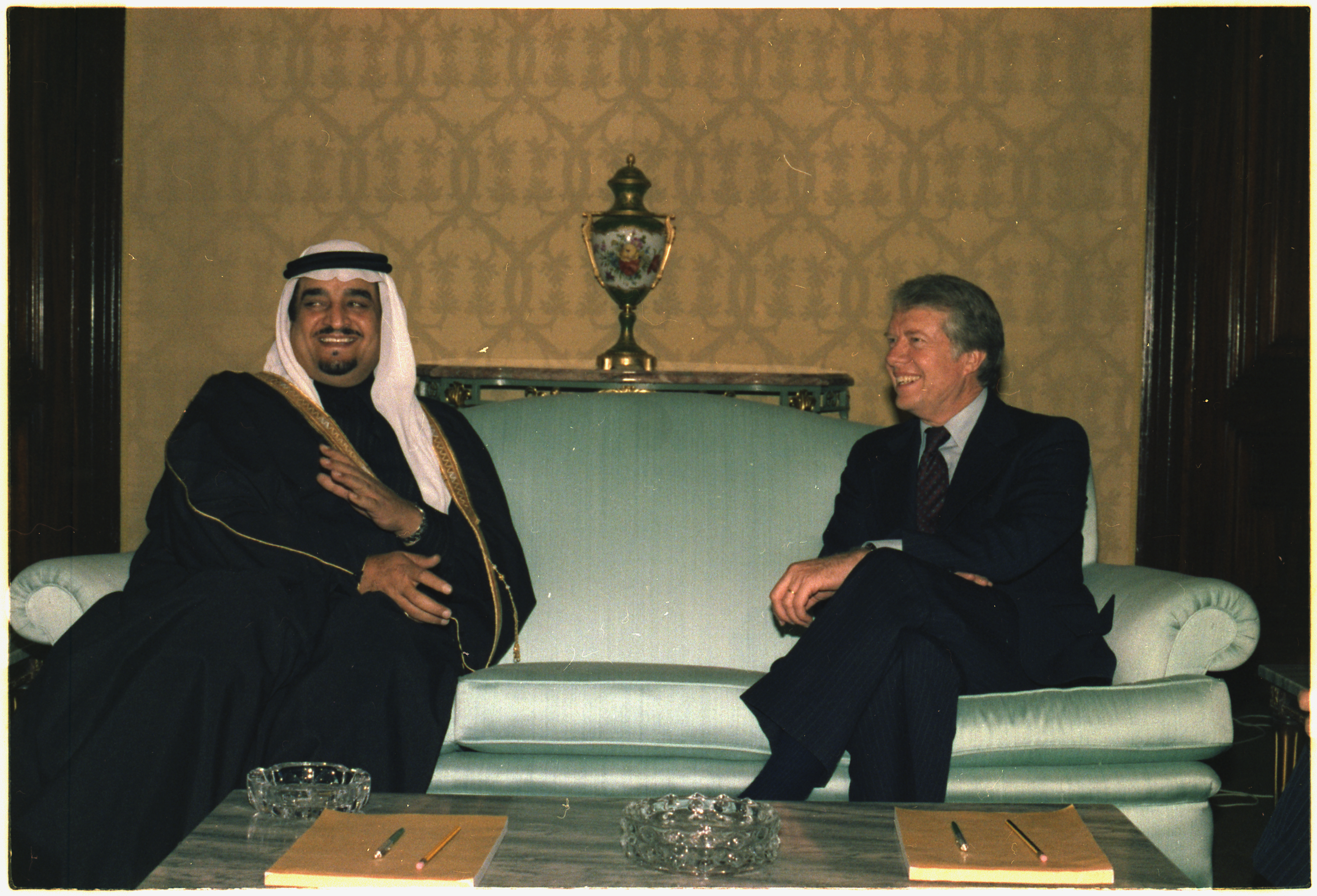
Carter with Crown Prince Fahd of Saudi Arabia

Carter was surprised by the Soviet invasion of Afghanistan, as the consensus of the U.S. intelligence community during 1978 and 1979 was that Moscow would not forcefully intervene. CIA officials had tracked the deployment of Soviet soldiers to the Afghan border, but they had not expected the Soviets to launch a full-fledged invasion. Carter believed that the Soviet conquest of Afghanistan would present a grave threat to the Persian Gulf region, and he vigorously responded to what he considered a dangerous provocation. In a televised speech, Carter announced sanctions on the Soviet Union, promised renewed aid to Pakistan, and articulated the Carter doctrine, which stated that the U.S. would repel any attempt to gain control of the Persian Gulf. Pakistani leader Muhammad Zia-ul-Haq had previously had poor relations with Carter due to Pakistan's nuclear program and the execution of Zulfikar Ali Bhutto, but the Soviet invasion of Afghanistan and instability in Iran reinvigorated the traditional Pakistan–United States alliance. In cooperation with Saudi Arabia, Britain's MI6, and Pakistan's Inter-Services Intelligence (ISI), Carter increased aid to the mujahideen through the CIA's Operation Cyclone. Carter also later announced a U.S. boycott of the 1980 Summer Olympics in Moscow and imposed an embargo on shipping American wheat to the Soviet Union. The embargo ultimately hurt American farmers more than it did the Soviet economy, and the United States lifted the embargo after Carter left office.

The Soviet invasion of Afghanistan brought a significant change in Carter's foreign policy and ended the period of detente that had begun in the mid-1960s. Returning to a policy of containment, the United States reconciled with Cold War allies and increased the defense budget, leading to a new arms race with the Soviet Union. U.S. support for the mujahideen in Afghanistan would continue until the Soviet Union withdrew from Afghanistan in 1989.

== Middle East ==
Historian Jørgen Jensehaugen argues that by the time Carter left office in January 1981, he:

was in an odd position—he had attempted to break with traditional US policy but ended up fulfilling the goals of that tradition, which had been to break up the Arab alliance, side-line the Palestinians, build an alliance with Egypt, weaken the Soviet Union and secure Israel.

=== Camp David Accords ===
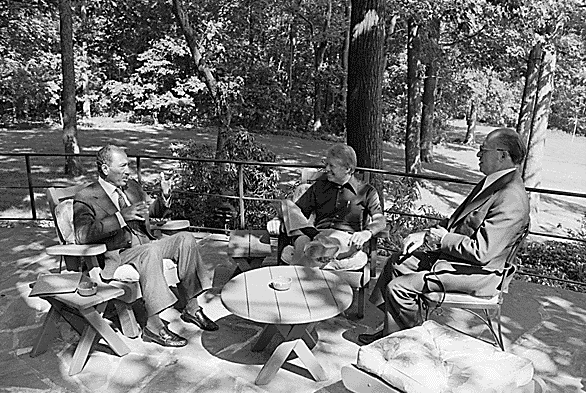
Anwar Sadat, Jimmy Carter and Menachem Begin meet on the Aspen Lodge patio of Camp David on September 6, 1978.

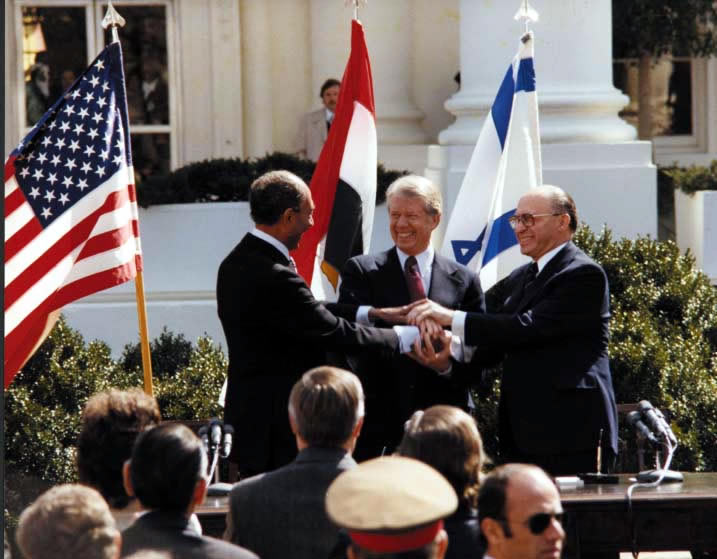
Sadat, Carter and Begin shaking hands after signing Peace treaty between Egypt and Israel in the White House, March 27, 1979

On taking office, Carter decided to attempt to mediate the long-running Arab–Israeli conflict. He sought a comprehensive settlement between Israel and its neighbors through a reconvening of the 1973 Geneva Conference, but these efforts had collapsed by the end of 1977. Though unsuccessful in reconvening the conference, Carter convinced Egyptian leader Anwar Sadat to visit Israel in 1978. Sadat's visit drew the condemnation of other Arab League countries, but Sadat and Israeli prime minister Menachem Begin each expressed an openness to bilateral talks. Begin sought security guarantees; Sadat sought the withdrawal of Israeli forces from the Sinai Peninsula and home rule for the West Bank and Gaza, Israeli-occupied territories that were largely populated by Palestinian Arabs. Israel had taken control of the West Bank and Gaza in the 1967 Six-Day War, while the Sinai had been occupied by Israel since the end of the 1973 Yom Kippur War.

Seeking to further negotiations, Carter invited Begin and Sadat to the presidential retreat of Camp David in September 1978. Because direct negotiations between Sadat and Begin proved unproductive, Carter began meeting with the two leaders individually. While Begin was willing to withdraw from the Sinai Peninsula, he refused to agree to the establishment of a Palestinian state. Israel had begun constructing settlements in the West Bank, which emerged as an important barrier to a peace agreement. Unable to come to definitive settlement over an Israeli withdrawal, the two sides reached an agreement in which Israel made vague promises to allow the creation of an elected government in the West Bank and Gaza. In return, Egypt became the first Arab state to recognize Israel's right to exist. The Camp David Accords were the subject of intense domestic opposition in both Egypt and Israel, as well as the wider Arab World, but each side agreed to negotiate a peace treaty on the basis of the accords.

On March 26, 1979, Egypt and Israel signed a peace treaty in Washington, D.C. Carter's role in getting the treaty was essential. Author Aaron David Miller concluded the following: "No matter whom I spoke to—Americans, Egyptians, or Israelis—most everyone said the same thing: no Carter, no peace treaty." Carter himself viewed the agreement as his most important accomplishment in office.

=== Iranian Revolution and hostage crisis ===
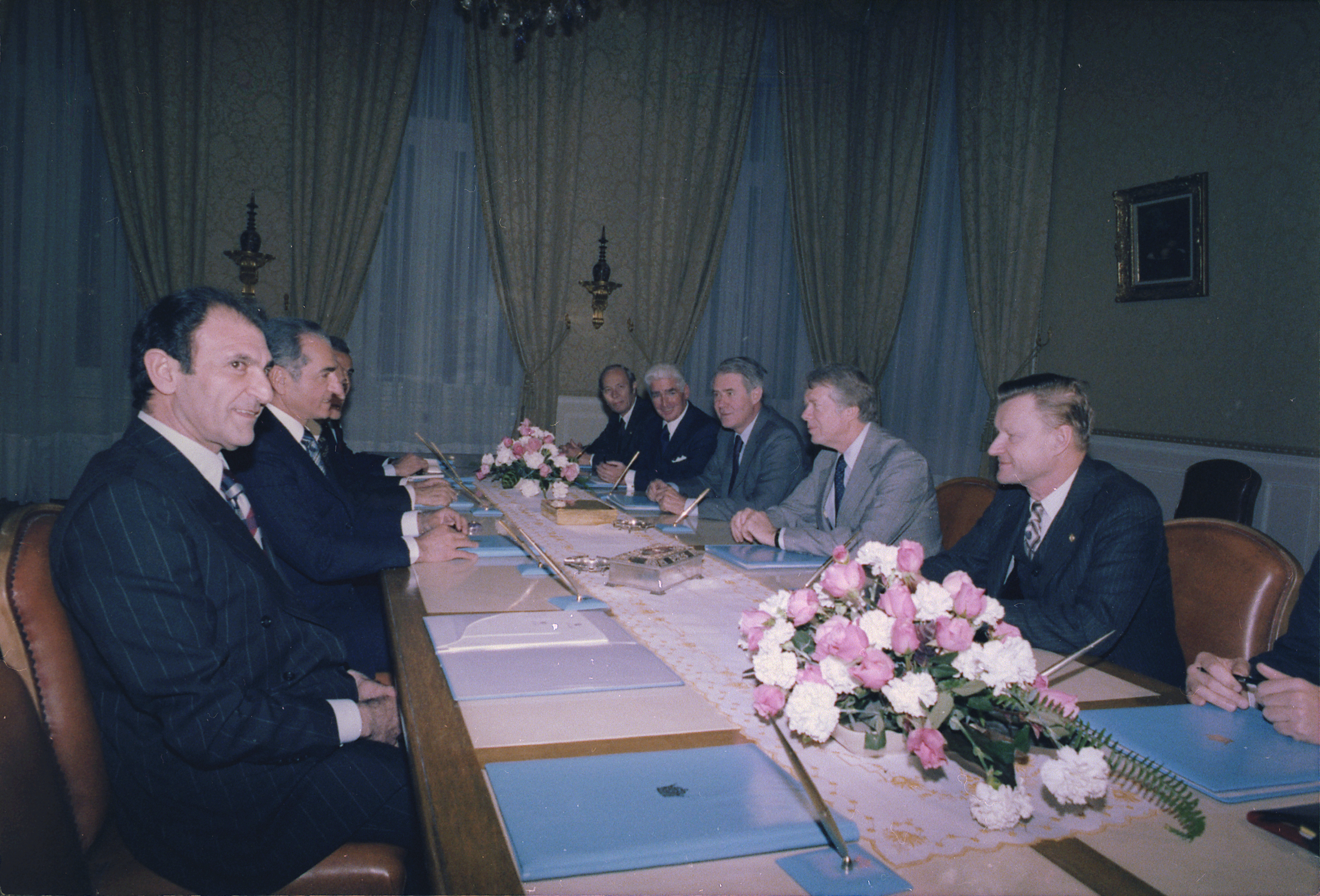
The Iranian Shah, Mohammad Reza Pahlavi, meeting with Alfred Atherton, William H. Sullivan, Cyrus Vance, President Jimmy Carter and Zbigniew Brzezinski in Tehran, 1977

Mohammad Reza Pahlavi, the Shah of Iran, had been a reliable U.S. ally since the 1953 Iranian coup d'état. During the years after the coup, the U.S. lavished aid on Iran, while Iran served as a dependable source of oil exports. Carter, Vance, and Brzezinski all viewed Iran as a key Cold War ally, not only for the oil it produced but also because of its influence in OPEC and its strategic position between the Soviet Union and the Persian Gulf. Despite human rights violations, Carter visited Iran in late 1977 and authorized the sale of U.S. fighter aircraft. That same year, rioting broke out in several cities, and it soon spread across the country. Poor economic conditions, the unpopularity of Pahlavi's "White Revolution", and an Islamic revival all led to increasing anger among Iranians, many of whom also despised the United States for its support of Pahlavi and its role in the 1953 coup. He praised Iran under the Shah as an "island of stability" which was possible because of "the love the people give to [the Shah]". He said the Shah showed "great leadership" and spoke of "personal friendship" between them.

The Carter administration's new demands for human rights angered the Shah, and split itself internally. Vance and the State Department made it a high priority, while Brzezinski warned that it would undermine the strength of America's most important ally in the region. The State Department's Bureau of Human Rights took an activist approach, under Derian's leadership. Carter allowed the sale of riot control equipment to suppress increasingly vocal and violent protests, especially from the religious element.

By 1978, the Iranian Revolution had broken out against the Shah's rule. Secretary of State Vance argued that the Shah should institute a series of reforms to appease the voices of discontent, while Brzezinski argued in favor of a crackdown on dissent. The mixed messages that the Shah received from Vance and Brzezinski contributed to his confusion and indecision. The Shah went into exile, leaving a caretaker government in control. A popular religious figure, Ayatollah Ruhollah Khomeini, returned from exile in February 1979 to popular acclaim. As the unrest continued, Carter allowed Pahlavi into the United States for medical treatment. Carter and Vance were both initially reluctant to admit Pahlavi due to concerns about the reaction in Iran, but Iranian leaders assured them that it would not cause an issue. In November 1979, shortly after Pahlavi was allowed to enter the U.S., a group of Iranians stormed the U.S. embassy in Tehran and took 66 American captives, beginning the Iran hostage crisis. Iranian prime minister Mehdi Bazargan ordered the militants to release the hostages, but he resigned from office after Khomeini backed the militants.

The crisis quickly became the subject of international and domestic attention, and Carter vowed to secure the release of the hostages. He refused the Iranian demand of the return of Pahlavi in exchange for the release of the hostages. His approval ratings rose as Americans rallied around his response, but the crisis became increasingly problematic for his administration as it continued. In an attempt to rescue the hostages, Carter launched Operation Eagle Claw in April 1980. The operation was a total disaster, and it ended in the death of eight American soldiers. The failure of the operation strengthened Ayatollah Khomenei's position in Iran and badly damaged Carter's domestic standing. Carter was dealt another blow when Vance, who had consistently opposed the operation, resigned. Iran refused to negotiate the return of the hostages until Iraq launched an invasion in September 1980. With Algeria serving as an intermediary, negotiations continued until an agreement was reached in January 1981. In return for releasing the 52 captives, Iran accepted over $7 billion in monetary compensation and the unfreezing of Iranian assets in the United States. Iran waited to release the captives until hours after Carter left office on January 20, 1981.

== Latin America ==
=== Panama Canal treaties ===
Statement on the Panama Canal Treaty Signing
Jimmy Carter's speech upon signing the Panama Canal treaty, September 7, 1977.

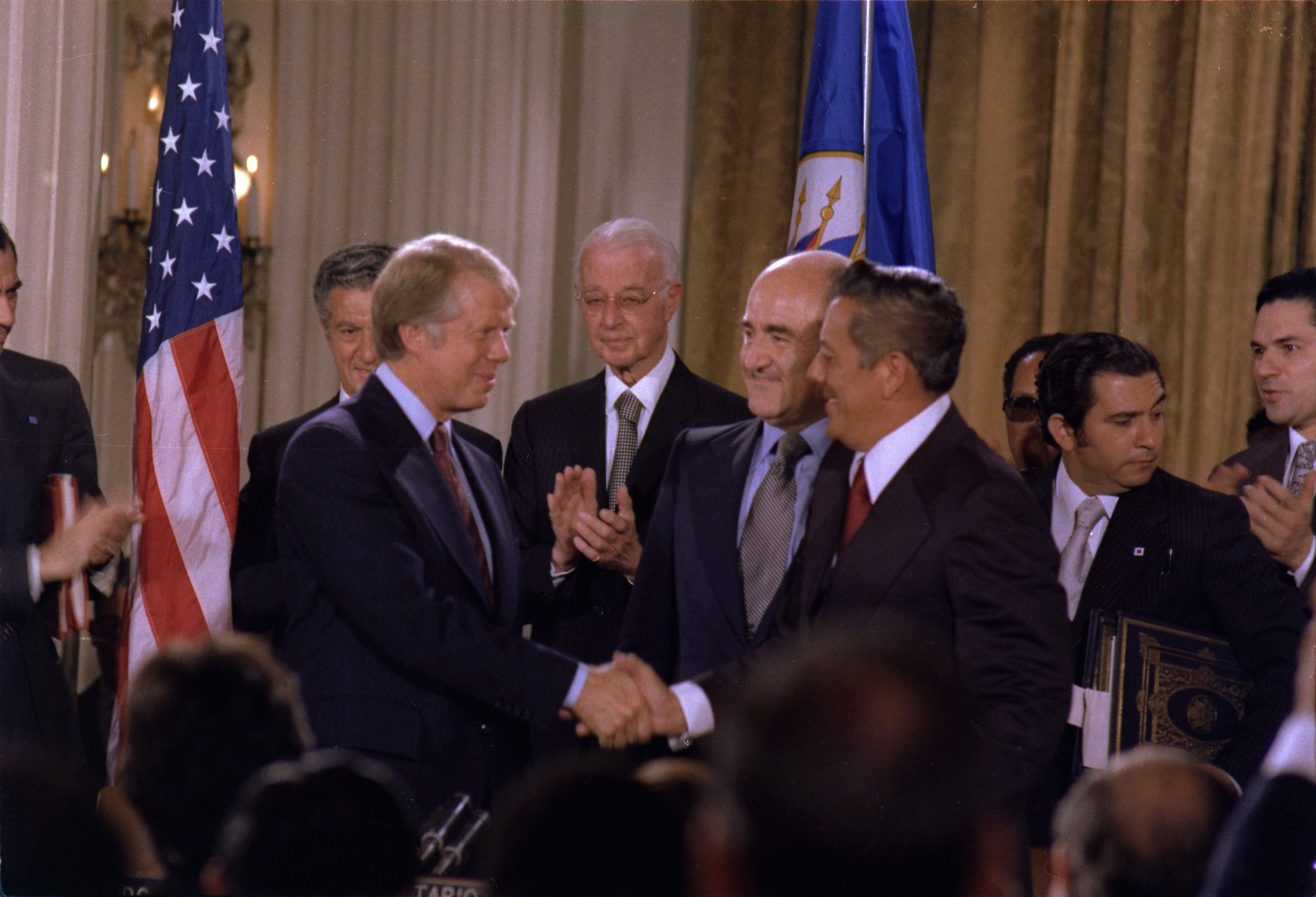
Carter and Omar Torrijos shake hands moments after the signing of the Torrijos-Carter Treaties.

Since the 1960s, Panama had called for the United States to cede control of the Panama Canal. The bipartisan national policy of turning over the Canal to Panama had been established by presidents Johnson, Nixon, and Ford, but negotiations had dragged on for a dozen years. Carter made the cession of the Panama Canal a priority, believing it would implement his call for a moral cleaning of American foreign policy and win approval across Latin America as a gracious apology for American wrongdoing. He also feared that another postponement of negotiations might precipitate violent upheaval in Panama, which could damage or block the canal.

The Carter administration negotiated the Torrijos-Carter Treaties, two treaties which provided that Panama would gain control of the canal in 1999. Carter's initiative faced wide resistance in the United States, and many in the public, particularly conservatives, thought that Carter was "giving away" a crucial U.S. asset. The attack against the treaties was mobilized by numerous groups, especially the American Conservative Union, the Conservative Caucus, the Committee for the Survival of a Free Congress, Citizens for the Republic, the American Security Council, the Young Republicans, the National Conservative Political Action Committee, the Council for National Defense, Young Americans for Freedom, the Council for Inter-American Security, and the Campus Republican Action Organization. Together, twenty organizations coordinated their attacks using two umbrella groups: the committee to Save the Panama Canal and the Emergency Coalition to Save the Panama Canal. This enabled the opposition to plan strategy and coordinate tactics while dividing tasks, sharing new information and pooling resources. In contrast, the supporters were not coordinated.

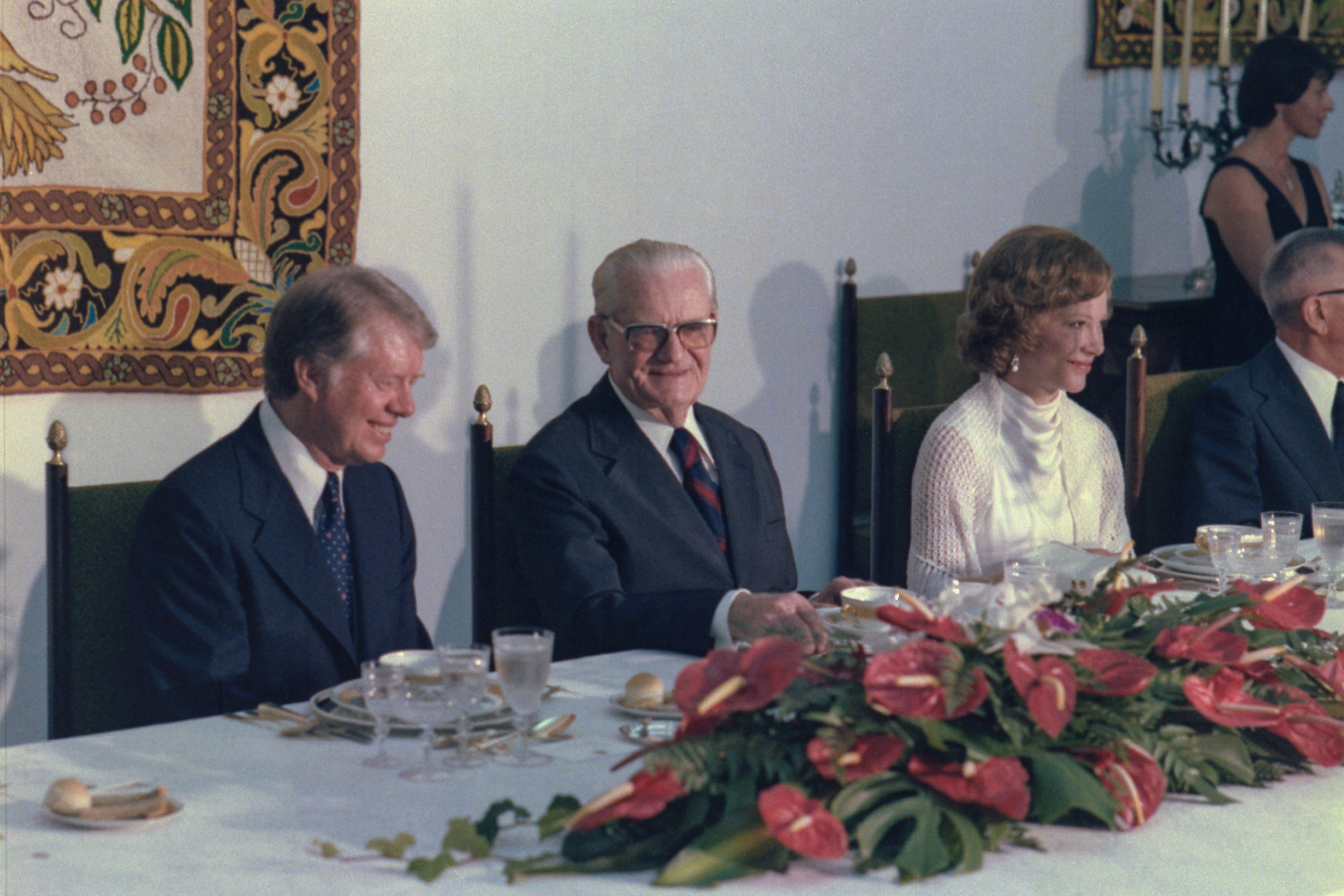
Carter with Brazilian President Ernesto Geisel during a formal dinner in the Palácio da Alvorada, Brasília, March 29, 1978

During its ratification debate, the Senate added amendments that granted the U.S. the right to intervene militarily to keep the canal open, which the Panamanians assented to after further negotiations. In March 1978, the Senate ratified both treaties by a margin of 68-to-32. The Canal Zone and all its facilities were turned over to Panama on 31 December 1999.

=== Cuba ===
Carter hoped to improve relations with Cuba upon taking office, but any thaw in relations was prevented by ongoing Cold War disputes in Central America and Africa. In early 1980, Cuban leader Fidel Castro announced that anyone who wished to leave Cuba would be allowed to do so through the port of Mariel. After Carter announced that the United States would provide "open arms for the tens of thousands of refugees seeking freedom from Communist domination", Cuban Americans arranged the Mariel boatlift. The Refugee Act, signed earlier in the year, had provided for annual cap of 19,500 Cuban immigrants to the United States per year, and required that those refugees go through a review process. By September, 125,000 Cubans had arrived in the United States, and many faced a lack of adequate food and housing. Carter was widely criticized for his handling of the boatlift, especially in the electorally important state of Florida.

=== Argentina ===
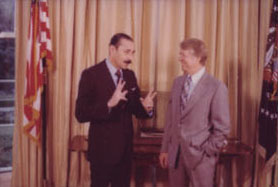
Argentine junta leader Jorge Rafael Videla meeting U.S. President Jimmy Carter in September 1977

Following the release of classified documents and an interview with Duane Clarridge, former CIA responsible for operations with the Contras, the Clarín showed that with the election of President Jimmy Carter in 1977 the CIA was blocked from engaging in the special warfare it had previously been engaged in. In conformity with the National Security Doctrine, the Argentine military supported U.S. goals in Latin America while they pressured the United States to be more active in counter-revolutionary activities. In 1981, following the election of Ronald Reagan the CIA took over training of the Contras from Batallón 601.

U.S. assistance, training and military sales to the Argentine military junta continued under the Carter administration until 1978. In 1977 and 1978, the United States sold more than $120,000,000 in military spare parts to Argentina and in 1977 the Department of Defense was granted $700,000 to train 217 Argentine military officers. By the time the International Military Education and Training (IMET) program was suspended to Argentina in 1978, total U.S. training costs for Argentine military personnel since 1976 totalled $1,115,000. In 1978, President Carter secured a congressional cutoff of all U.S. arms transfers for the human rights violations. U.S.-Argentine relations improved dramatically under Ronald Reagan, who believed that the previous Carter administration had weakened U.S. diplomatic relations with its Cold War allies in Argentina and reversed the previous administration's official condemnation of the junta's human rights practices.

=== El Salvador ===
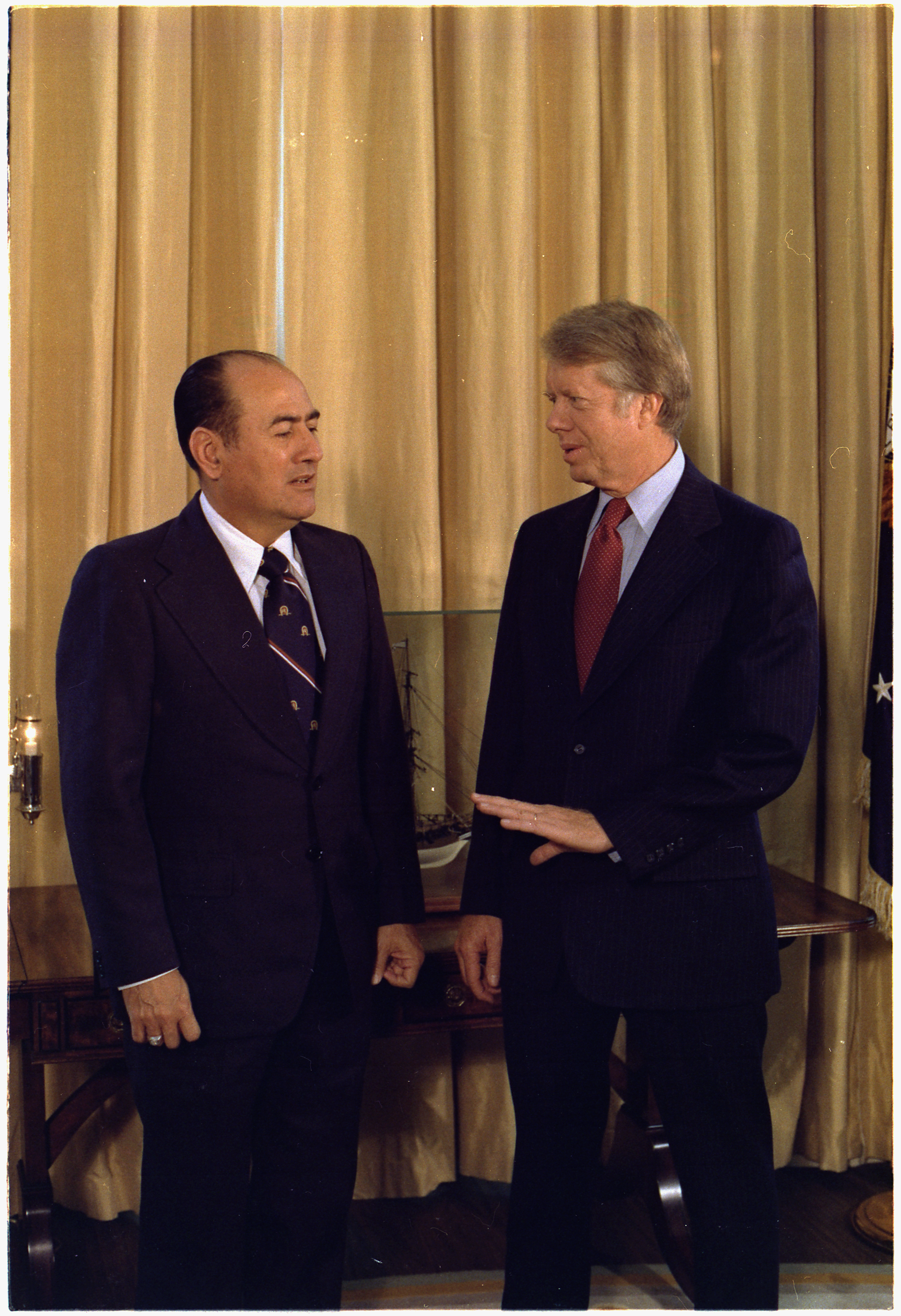
Romero with U.S. President Jimmy Carter on 8 September 1977

The Carter administration took an active role in the 1979 Salvadoran coup d'état. It is clear that the U.S. was aware of the plan beforehand. The U.S. had been the biggest supporter of the regime of Carlos Humberto Romero, but by October 1979, the Carter administration decided that El Salvador needed regime change. Following the coup, the United States immediately recognized the junta's legitimacy as the government of El Salvador. The coup is commonly cited as the beginning of the twelve year-long Salvadoran Civil War.

In his last week in office Carter sent five million dollars in military aid to the Revolutionary Government Junta of El Salvador.

== Asia ==
In dealing with Asia, Carter transformed the regional landscape by normalizing relations with China, while maintaining good terms with Japan. On the downside, Taiwan felt deserted, and troop withdrawals from South Korea were mishandled. Carter hoped that, by improving relations with China, the Soviet Union would be pressured to moderate its aggressive relationship with Afghanistan, to no avail. The U.S. was hostile to Vietnam because it was allied to the USSR. Carter supported China in its short border war with Vietnam in 1979. One surprise was his support for the Khmer Rouge forces in Cambodia fighting against Vietnam's invasion, despite its terrible human rights record.

Carter was hostile to Pakistan under Zia-ul-Haq because of its human rights violations and efforts to build nuclear weapons. Overnight he reversed course in 1979 after the Soviet invasion of Afghanistan. Pakistan now became the main American route for sending support to the anti-Soviet fighters in Afghanistan. Carter at first was especially friendly toward India, but when India sided more with Moscow, Carter backed away and refused to help with India's nuclear energy program. The United States augmented its military strength in the Indian Ocean, seeing it as an extension of the Pacific and a prime link to the Persian Gulf oil supplies. In the long run, Reagan and other successors picked up on Carter's human rights goal, and so it proved an important innovation in American policy. Good terms with China flourished for another decade.

The United States, which had provided hundreds of millions of dollars in aid, was crucial in supporting the Ferdinand Marcos regime in the Philippines, although during the Carter administration the relationship with the U.S. had soured somewhat when President Carter targeted the Philippines in his human rights campaign. Despite this, the Carter administration provided military aid to the Marcos regime.

=== Rapprochement with China ===
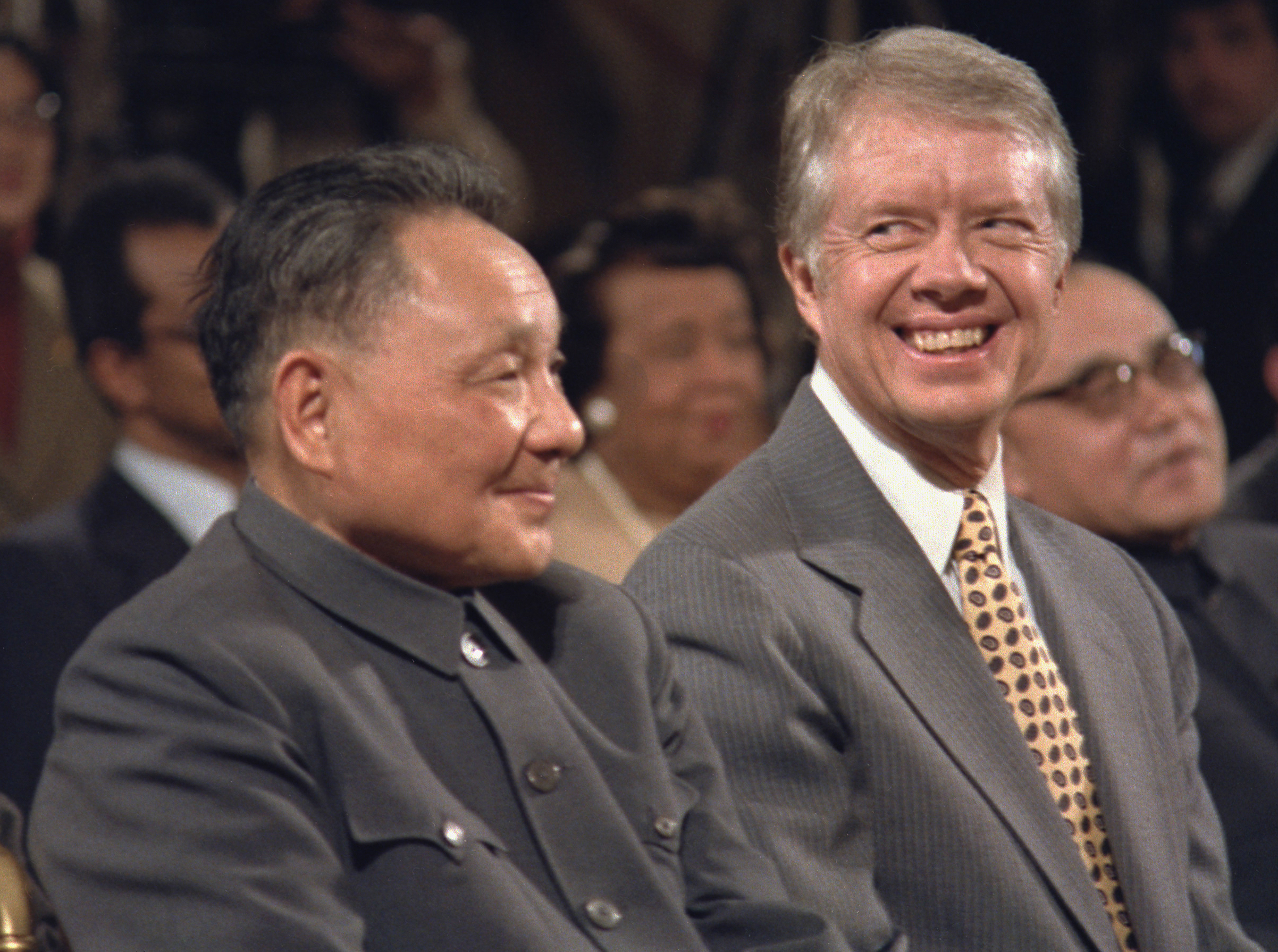
Deng Xiaoping with President Carter

Continuing a dramatic rapprochement begun during the Nixon administration, Carter sought closer relations with the People's Republic of China (PRC). The two countries increasingly collaborated against the Soviet Union, and the Carter administration tacitly consented to the Chinese invasion of Vietnam. In 1979, Carter extended formal diplomatic recognition to the PRC for the first time. This decision led to a boom in trade between the United States and the PRC, which was pursuing economic reforms under the leadership of Deng Xiaoping. After the Soviet invasion of Afghanistan, Carter allowed the sale of military supplies to China and began negotiations to share military intelligence. In January 1980, Carter unilaterally revoked the Sino-American Mutual Defense Treaty with the Republic of China (ROC), which had lost control of mainland China to the PRC in 1949, but retained control the island of Taiwan. Carter's abrogation of the treaty was challenged in court by conservative Republicans, but the Supreme Court ruled that the issue was a non-justiciable political question in Goldwater v. Carter. The U.S. continued to maintain diplomatic contacts with the ROC through the 1979 Taiwan Relations Act.

=== South Korea ===
Carter was outraged at human rights abuses in South Korea under President Park Chung Hee. He responded by ordering the withdrawal of troops from South Korea, which had hosted a large force that guaranteed American protection against North Korea. Opponents of the withdrawal feared that North Korea would invade. Japan and South Korea both protested the move, as did many members of Congress, the Pentagon, and the State Department. After a strong backlash, Carter delayed the withdrawal, and ultimately only a fraction of the forces left Korea. Carter's attempt weakened the government of Park Chung Hee, who was assassinated in 1979.

After General Chun Doo-hwan overthrew the government during both the Coup d'état of December Twelfth and the Coup d'état of May Seventeenth and established yet another dictatorship, the students and local residents of the city of Gwangju in Jeolla Province rose up in revolt against the newly founded military dictatorship and demanded democracy. President Carter helped provide assistance to Chun by allowing him to consolidate and cement his grip on power, such as giving approval to Chun's plans to deploy the ROK military divisions stationed at the DMZ south towards Gwangju. Carter's support for Chun gave him the much needed legitimacy and support he needed to crush the Gwangju Uprising, which led to the deaths and disappearances of hundreds. Even decades after the Gwangju massacre, Carter never publicly commented on his role in assisting Chun to crush the pro-democracy uprising.

=== Indonesia ===
The Carter administration continued the Nixon and Ford administration's policy of supporting the "New Order" in Indonesia under Suharto. Although the regime was usually classified as a dictatorship by foreign observers, it was still supported by the U.S. due to its strong opposition to Communism. The Carter administration continued to support the regime, even in spite of its violation of human rights in the December 1975 invasion and occupation of East Timor.

== Africa ==
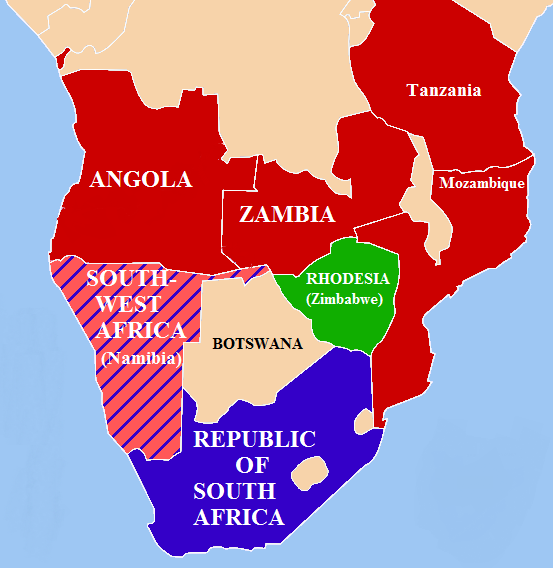
Geopolitical situation in southern Africa, 1978–79. South West Africa (Namibia) SWAPO allies South Africa South African allies

In sharp contrast to Nixon and Ford, Carter gave priority to sub-Sahara Africa. The chief policy person was Andrew Young, a leader in Atlanta's black community who became Ambassador to the United Nations. Young opened up friendly relationships with key African leaders, especially in Nigeria. A highly controversial issue was US relations with South Africa, which was under criticism from other African states for its policy of racial segregation (apartheid) and continued occupation of Namibia, which had been deemed illegal by the United Nations. Young began United Nations discussions on Namibian independence which went nowhere, and South Africa would not grant that territory independence until 1991, long after Carter left office. Young advocated comprehensive economic sanctions on South Africa after the murder of anti-apartheid activist Steve Biko in 1977, but Carter refused and only imposed a limited arms embargo.

Until 1975, the United States had largely ignored Southern Africa. Weak Soviet-backed insurgencies existed in Angola, Mozambique, Rhodesia, and Namibia, but did not appear to threaten the colonial and white minority governments of those countries. The dissolution of the Portuguese Empire in April 1974 meant the end of colonial rule in Angola and Mozambique. The region emerged as a Cold War battleground in 1976, after Cuba sent a large military force that helped the Marxist MPLA movement seize power in Angola.

The Carter administration tried unsuccessfully to facilitate dialogue between South Africa and the South West Africa People's Organisation (SWAPO), which was the leading pro-independence party in Namibia. Vance and Brzezinski clashed over foreign policy in Angola and Namibia, but the U.S. never became directly involved in either country and the Carter administration never found an effective solution. Meanwhile, Cuba and the Soviet Union gave strong military support to both the MPLA and SWAPO.

When Somalia invaded Ethiopia in July 1977 in the Ogaden War, the Cold War played a role. The Soviets, who traditionally backed Somalia, now switched to support of the Marxist regime in Ethiopia. The United States remained neutral because Somalia was clearly the aggressor nation, and in 1978 with the assistance of 20,000 Cuban troops, Ethiopia defeated Somalia. The most important American success was helping the transition from white-dominated Southern Rhodesia to black rule in Zimbabwe. The United States supported UN resolutions and sanctions that proved effective in April 1980. Despite human rights concerns, Carter continued U.S. support for Joseph Mobutu of Zaire, who defeated Angolan-backed insurgents in conflicts known as Shaba I and Shaba II. Because of Mobutu's poor human rights record, the Carter Administration put some distance between itself and the Kinshasa government; even so, Zaire received nearly half the foreign aid Carter allocated to sub-Saharan Africa. During the first Shaba invasion, the United States played a relatively inconsequential role; its belated intervention consisted of little more than the delivery of non-lethal supplies. But during the second Shaba invasion, the US played a much more active and decisive role by providing transportation and logistical support to the French and Belgian paratroopers that were deployed to aid Mobutu against the rebels. Carter echoed Mobutu's (unsubstantiated) charges of Soviet and Cuban aid to the rebels, until it was apparent that no hard evidence existed to verify his claims. In 1980, the US House of Representatives voted to terminate military aid to Zaire, but the US Senate reinstated the funds, in response to pressure from Carter and American business interests in Zaire.

Under Carter an allyship with Liberia's Samuel Doe who had come to power in a 1980 coup was pursued. Carter provided aid and sent US troops to train the Liberian army.

Historians generally agree that the Carter administration's initiatives in Africa were largely unsuccessful, but offer multiple explanations for the policy failures. The orthodox interpretation posits Carter as a dreamy star-eyed idealist. Revisionists said that did not matter nearly as much as the intense rivalry between dovish Secretary of State Cyrus Vance and hawkish National Security Adviser Zbigniew Brzezinski. Meanwhile, there are now post-revisionist historians who blame his failures on his confused management style and his refusal to make tough decisions. Along post-revisionist lines, Nancy Mitchell in a monumental book depicts Carter as a decisive but ineffective Cold Warrior, who, nevertheless had some successes because Soviet incompetence was even worse.

== Canada ==
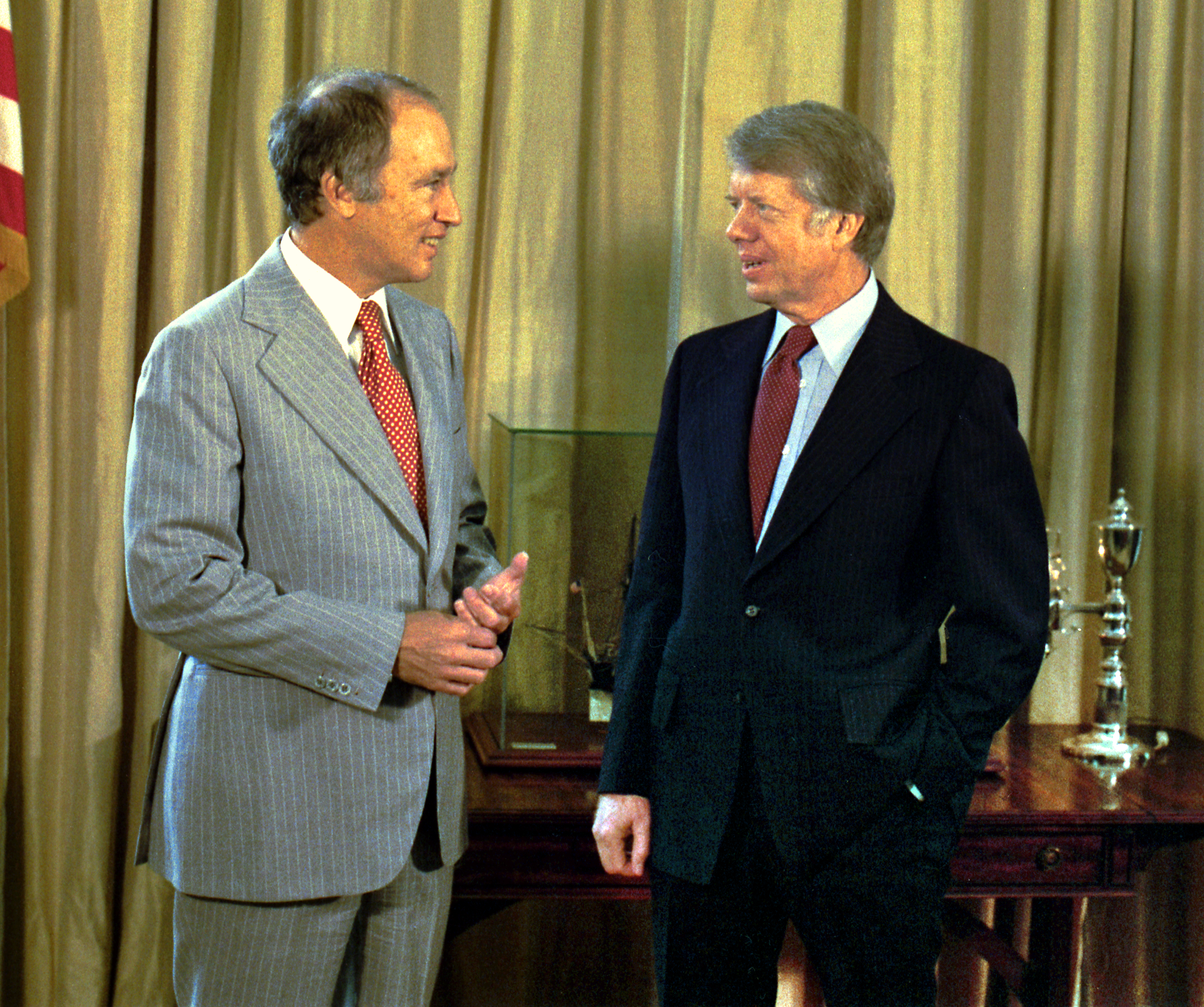
Carter with Canadian Prime Minister Pierre Trudeau in September 1977

Relations with Canada had deteriorated under the Nixon administration on many points, including trade disputes, defense agreements, energy, fishing, the environment, cultural imperialism, and foreign policy. They changed for the better when Prime Minister Pierre Trudeau and Carter found a better rapport. The late 1970s saw a more sympathetic American attitude toward Canadian political and economic needs, the pardoning of draft evaders who had moved to Canada, and the passing of old matters such as Watergate and the Vietnam War. Canada more than ever welcomed American investments during "the stagflation" that hurt both nations.

== International trips ==
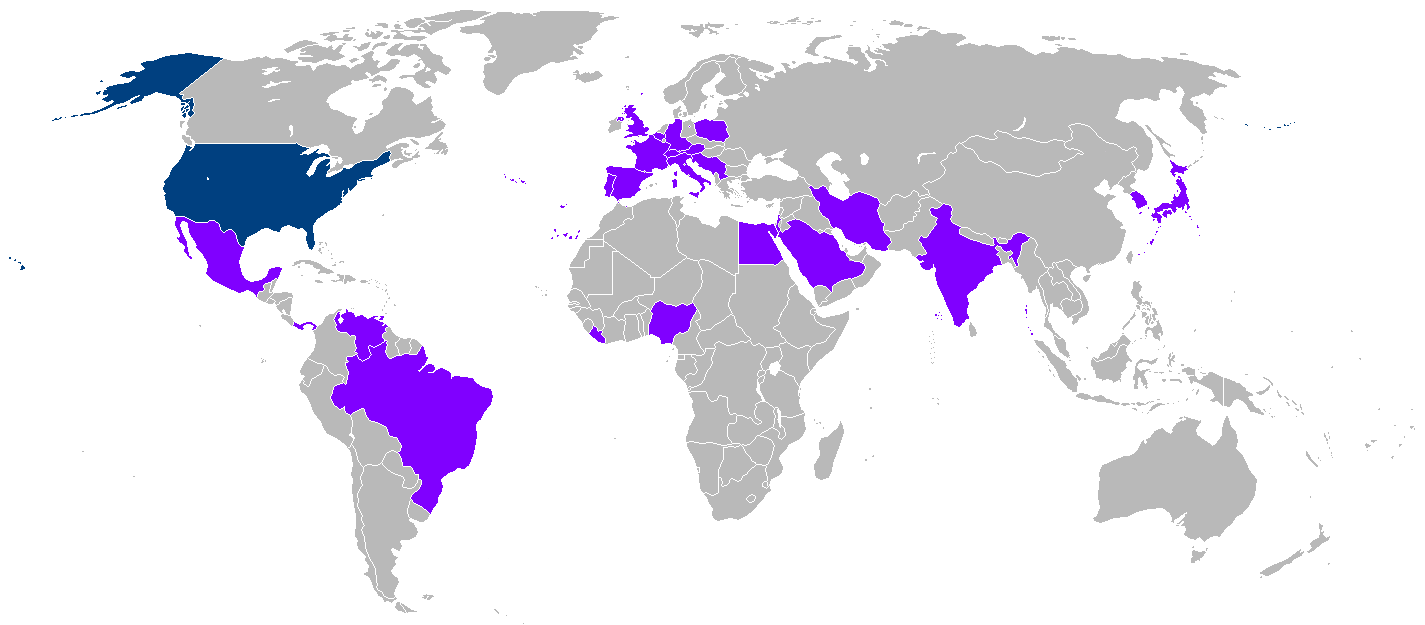
Countries visited by President Carter during his time in office

The number of visits per country where he travelled are:

- Once to Austria, Belgium, Brazil, India, Iran, Israel, Italy, Liberia, Nigeria, Panama, Poland, Portugal, Saudi Arabia, South Korea, Spain, Switzerland, the United Kingdom, Vatican City, Venezuela, West Germany, and Yugoslavia.
- Twice to France, Japan, and Mexico.
- Thrice to Egypt

== See also ==
- Foreign policy of the Richard Nixon administration
- Foreign policy of the Gerald Ford administration
