= American defense of Taiwan =

Military and security assistance of Taiwan by the United States

American defense of Taiwan is the policy by which the United States provides military aid, security assurances, and diplomatic support to help Taiwan safeguard its national security. This policy began with the signing of the Mutual Defense Treaty between the United States and the Republic of China between the United States and the Republic of China (ROC) in 1954. However, after the United States established diplomatic relations with the People's Republic of China (PRC) in 1979, the treaty was unilaterally terminated by the U.S. It was subsequently replaced by the Taiwan Relations Act, a domestic U.S. law.

The U.S. views Taiwan as geostrategically important given its location in the first island chain. Under U.S. defense commitment to Taiwan, the United States provides defensive weapons, intelligence sharing, military training, military advisors, and other forms of support to Taiwan. The federal government of the United States also supports Taiwan's participation in international matters, such as inviting Taiwanese delegations to attend President of the United States inaugurations.

The American defense of Taiwan commitment to Taiwan has broad support within Taiwan, but it is opposed by the government of the People's Republic of China. The Chinese Communist Party considers Taiwan an inseparable part of China and opposes any foreign military intervention in Taiwan's affairs. In recent years, pressure and threats from mainland China toward Taiwan have intensified, drawing international attention.

In April 2001, George W. Bush publicly announced the American defense of Taiwan. In 2017, the National Security Council introduced the Free and Open Indo-Pacific, which, in the event of armed conflict between the United States and the People's Republic of China, includes "defending countries in the first island chain, including Taiwan." This framework was approved by President Donald Trump in 2018. In February 2021, the United States Congress reintroduced the "Taiwan Invasion Prevention Act," which aims to legally authorize the U.S. president to use limited force to defend Taiwan if necessary.

== History ==
=== 1954–1980 mutual defense treaty era ===
Following the 1954 treaty's entry into force, the United States maintained forces and a dedicated United States Taiwan Defense Command on Taiwan. After the United States recognized the PRC on January 1, 1979, the U.S. delivered notice of termination of the treaty to Taipei. Consistent with Article X, the treaty lapsed on January 1, 1980. The TRA, enacted April 10, 1979, established the post-recognition legal basis for continued security assistance and other unofficial relations.

=== 1995–1996 Taiwan Strait crisis ===
During the Third Taiwan Strait Crisis the United States deployed carrier battle groups (including USS Independence and USS Nimitz) to waters near Taiwan in March 1996 as a show of resolve. U.S. forces operated primarily to the island's east, and no mutual defense obligation was invoked.

In April 2001, U.S. President George W. Bush declared that the United States would "do everything it can to defend Taiwan." His successor, President Barack Obama, did not make any public or clear statements regarding the use of force by the People's Republic of China to unify Taiwan by force, nor about U.S. military intervention to defend Taiwan. In 2018, the Free and Open Indo-Pacific approved by President Donald Trump included the goal of "defending Taiwan."

The Taiwan Relations Act and the Six Assurances indicate that the United States has not made specific commitments to defend Taiwan. Legally, while the U.S. government may decide on actions through constitutional processes, it is also possible that no military response would follow such a decision. During the administrations of Donald Trump and Joe Biden, members of the U.S. Congress repeatedly introduced legislation aimed at formally authorizing the use of military force to defend Taiwan.

=== 2001 Bush statements ===
In 2001, the Bush administration identified the People's Republic of China as a strategic competitor and adopted a more assertive policy. On April 24, the U.S. announced three arms deals with Taiwan. The next day, President George W. Bush described the package as “the right package for the moment” and stated the U.S. would “do whatever it took to defend herself,” a remark widely interpreted as signaling a shift from “strategic ambiguity” to “strategic clarity.”

In a CNN interview on April 26, Bush reaffirmed support for Taiwan's self-defense and said U.S. policy remained unchanged, emphasizing peaceful resolution and adherence to the “One China” principle. On May 17, he reiterated that the U.S. would assist Taiwan if China used force. During a 2002 visit to China, Bush affirmed both the “One China” policy and the Taiwan Relations Act, stressing that neither side should provoke the other and that disputes should be settled peacefully.

=== 2018 Indo-Pacific guidance (declassified) ===
In 2018, President Donald Trump initiated the China–United States trade war, leading to the Second Cold War. On June 10, 2020, Republican Party Senator Josh Hawley introduced the Taiwan Defense Act in the United States Senate. On June 30, Republican Representatives Ted Yoho and Mike Gallagher introduced the same bill in the United States House of Representatives. On July 29, Ted Yoho introduced the Taiwan Invasion Prevention Act (H.R. 7855), which sought to clarify and strengthen the U.S. commitment to defending Taiwan in the event of an armed attack, stating that "the bill draws a red line for Beijing, asserting that Taiwan's future must be determined peacefully." Earlier, on July 17, Ted Yoho told Fox Business host Lou Dobbs that "The bill will clearly specify that if China invades Taiwan, it will authorize the U.S. president to use force in response, with a 5-year sunset provision." Due to the timing of the 2020 United States presidential election, the bill did not make it to the agenda.

On January 5, 2021, just days before President Donald Trump's departure from office, the White House National Security Council declassified a 2017 document outlining the Free and Open Indo-Pacific. The document, approved by President Trump in February 2018, was released to the public on January 12, 2021. Assistant to the President for National Security Affairs Robert O'Brien stated in the declassified memorandum that the document transparently demonstrates the U.S. commitment to the Indo-Pacific region and its strategic partnerships. On January 12, the White House National Security Council released documents. The document specifically addressed one of China's seven major objectives, which was to "prevent China from using force against the U.S. and its allies and partners, while developing capabilities and plans to defeat China in various conflicts." Among the defense strategies outlined, three key points were identified:

1. Deny China continuous air and naval dominance in the first island chain during a conflict
2. Defend the first island chain nations, including Taiwan
3. Dominate all areas outside the first island chain.

=== 2021–present legislative and executive actions ===
On January 20, 2021, President Joe Biden took office and continued a tough policy toward China, with the China–United States trade war ongoing. After the new Congress convened, on February 18, Republican Senator Rick Scott and Representative Guy Reschenthaler reintroduced the Taiwan Invasion Prevention Act in both the Senate and House of Representatives. Scott's proposal (S.332 - Taiwan Invasion Prevention Act) aimed to:

- Help Taiwan counter Communist China's military buildup across the Taiwan Strait;
- Establish a limited authorization for the president to use military force specifically to secure and protect Taiwan from armed attack.

In response to the military pressure from the People's Republic of China, Richard Haass, president of the Council on Foreign Relations, and certain U.S. lawmakers advocated for the U.S. government to adopt a strategy of "strategic clarity" to deter the possibility of China using force to liberation of Taiwan. On April 29, the United States Senate Committee on Armed Services held a hearing on global threats the U.S. faces. When Committee Chairman, Democratic Senator Jack Reed, asked whether the U.S. should shift from a policy of strategic ambiguity to one of making clear commitments to Taiwan, the Director of National Intelligence Avril Haines responded that the People's Republic of China would view the U.S. commitment to Taiwan as "creating tremendous instability," which could lead China to "aggressively undermine U.S. interests globally." She also noted that such a policy shift "could potentially" push Taiwan further toward declaring independence.

On May 4, during a discussion hosted by the Financial Times, Kurt Campbell, the U.S. National Security Council's Free and Open Indo-Pacific Coordinator, responded to calls from U.S. figures urging the government to clarify its position on defending Taiwan. He stated that such a clear commitment would have "significant drawbacks." He warned that if the People's Republic of China (PRC) were to use force to unify Taiwan and the U.S. intervened to defend Taiwan, any conflict arising between the PRC and the U.S. over Taiwan would "not likely be confined to a small geographic area." He continued, saying, "I think it would quickly escalate and fundamentally destroy the global economy in ways that no one could predict."

On October 21, during a CNN interview, President Joe Biden was asked, "If China attacks Taiwan, will the U.S. defend Taiwan?" Biden answered twice, "Yes, we have a commitment." On October 22, White House Press Secretary stated, "The President's comments do not signal any change in our policy. Our policy remains unchanged." On the same day, U.S. Secretary of Defense Lloyd Austin, while at NATO Headquarters in Brussels, affirmed U.S. support for Taiwan's forces but refused to confirm Biden's statements regarding military defense of Taiwan in the event of a Chinese attack. NATO Secretary-General Jens Stoltenberg, when asked about the risk of NATO forces being involved in a potential U.S.-PRC conflict over Taiwan, declined to "speculate on a hypothetical situation."

In April 2022, former Japanese Prime Minister Shinzo Abe published an article in a U.S. newspaper, comparing Taiwan to Ukraine and urging the U.S. to make a clear commitment to defend Taiwan. On April 15, Spokesperson of the Ministry of Foreign Affairs of China Zhao Lijian, during a regular press conference, responded by stating, "Some Japanese politicians have repeatedly made irresponsible comments on Taiwan, interfering in China's internal affairs, provoking great power confrontation, and with ulterior motives. China strongly opposes this. Taiwan is an inseparable part of China's territory. The Taiwan issue is entirely China's internal matter, fundamentally different from the issue of Ukraine, and there is no comparison to be made. Japan once colonized Taiwan for half a century, committing numerous atrocities and bearing serious historical responsibility to the Chinese people. Japanese politicians should be especially cautious on the Taiwan issue and avoid sending the wrong signals to 'Taiwan independence' forces."

On May 23, 2022, U.S. President Joe Biden, during his visit to Japan, clearly stated at a joint press conference with Japanese Prime Minister Fumio Kishida that the U.S. would deploy American troops to assist in defending Taiwan. The next day, Biden clarified that the U.S. would maintain its "strategic ambiguity" policy toward Taiwan.

On September 17, 2022, Biden reiterated, during an interview with CBS's 60 Minutes, that the U.S. would deploy forces to defend Taiwan if China were to attack.

On November 16, 2023, during talks with U.S. President Biden, General Secretary of the Chinese Communist Party and president of China Xi Jinping reaffirmed China's firm stance on peaceful reunification with Taiwan and called for the U.S. to halt arms sales to Taiwan and support its peaceful unification. In response, U.S. Secretary of Defense Lloyd Austin stated that the U.S. would continue to take necessary actions in accordance with the Taiwan Relations Act to help Taiwan obtain means of self-defense.

== Defense measures ==
=== Defense strategy ===
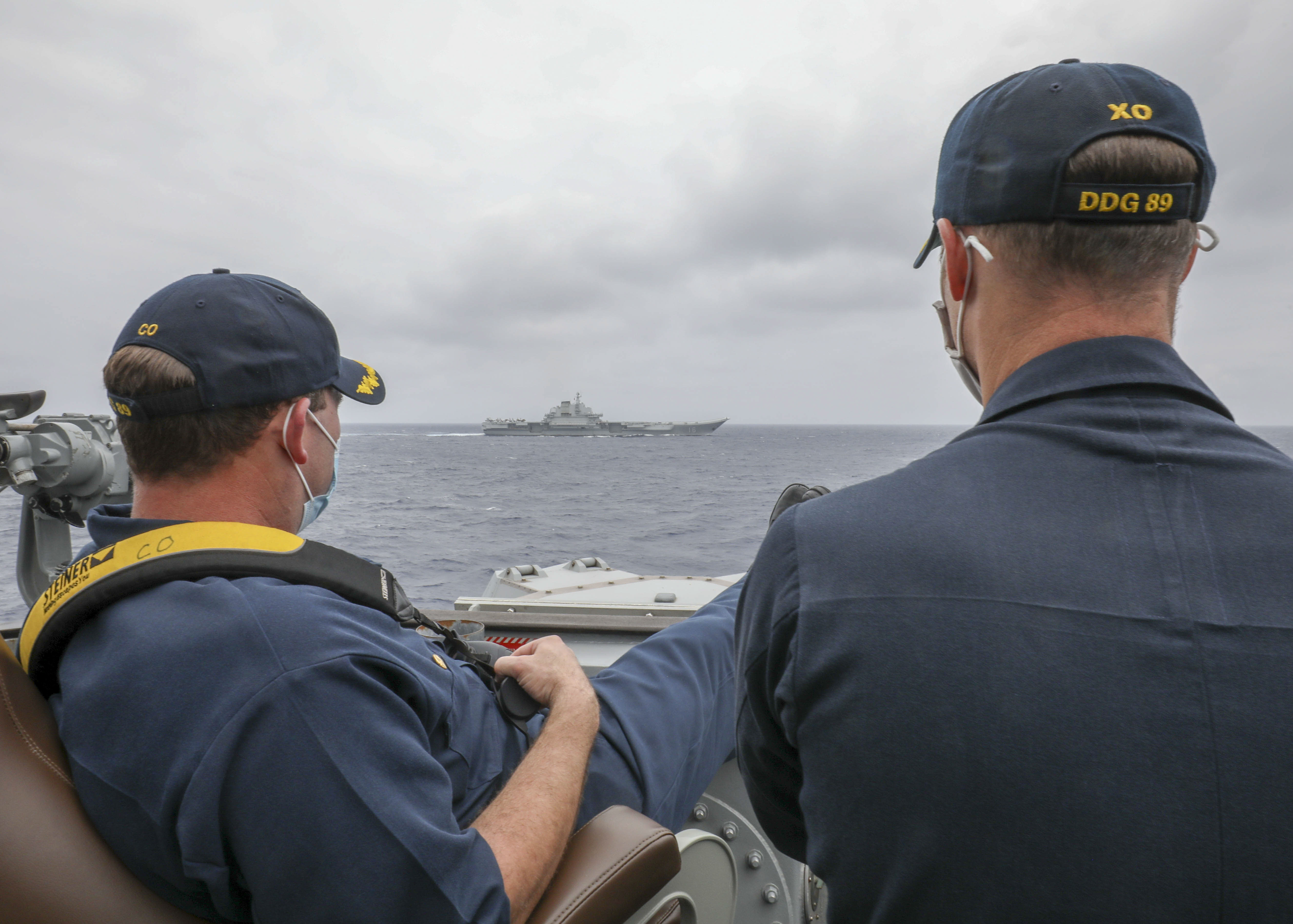
On April 4, 2021, in the Philippine Sea, U.S. Navy officers of the Mustin destroyer stood on their feet and looked at the Chinese aircraft carrier Liaoning . In 2021, the U.S. Navy has 11 carrier battle groups, and the PLA Navy has 2.

Wang Yunfei, a senior researcher at the Hong Kong San Ce Think Tank, divides the U.S. defense of Taiwan into two types in terms of space: short-range assistance and long-range assistance. Short-range assistance is provided by United States Forces Japan and United States Forces Korea. Long-distance assistance includes support from the Contiguous United States worldwide in the United States.

In his 2004 article, Wang Yifeng, an author from the People's Republic of China, pointed out that the military forces used by the United States to defend Taiwan are mainly 300,000 troops from the US Pacific Command and part of the Japan Self-Defense Forces. The United States Seventh Fleet is the main force. There are three military defense modes:

- Vietnam mode
  - Similar to the Vietnam War, the US military concentrated its main forces to implement a key maritime blockade and rapid deployment against the People's Republic of China.
- North Korea mode
  - Similar to the Korean War, the US military directly sent part of its forces to Taiwan.
- Japanese mode
  - After the People's Liberation Army (PLA) occupied Taiwan Island, the US military fought in the New Britain campaign and wiped out the PLA on Taiwan Island. Wang Yifeng believes that this is the US military's preferred option.

In a 2006 article, author Hai Wei pointed out that, due to the well-known fact that "Americans are afraid of casualties in war," the U.S. military would not land in Taiwan and engage in ground combat with the People's Liberation Army (PLA). He argued, "Not to mention the chances of victory, the foreseeable massive casualties would be too much for the U.S. to bear." Based on the personnel and equipment of the PLA at the time, Hai Wei believed that a Chinese military unification of Taiwan "would be no problem," and that when facing joint U.S. and Japanese defense assistance to Taiwan, the PLA would have "a good chance of success."

In his speculation on how the U.S. would defend Taiwan, Hai Wei suggested that the U.S. Navy would form a joint fleet with two or three aircraft carrier battle group and the Japan Maritime Self-Defense Force. This joint fleet would use its significant sea and air superiority to contain or even overwhelm the PLA's naval and air forces, then further attack PLA landing forces with carrier-based aircraft and strike radar stations and missile bases on China's southeastern coast, forcing the People's Republic of China "to come to the negotiating table." He described this as a "relatively safe option for the U.S. and Japan, with losses that are manageable." Hai Wei speculated that the U.S. aircraft carrier strike groups would engage in combat with the PLA 600 kilometers east of the Taiwan Strait. He argued that in the contest for air supremacy over the Taiwan Strait between the PLA and the U.S.-Japan-Taiwan alliance, it would be difficult for the PLA to organize an effective strike against U.S. aircraft carrier strike groups. Without air superiority, the PLA would not be able to win the war merely by relying on the deterrence effect of its nuclear submarines. At the time, the PLA's Sukhoi Su-30 and JH-7 aircraft had a combat radius of only about 1,000 kilometers, which was insufficient to pose a major threat to the U.S. fleet. Hai Wei hoped to introduce no fewer than 12 and ideally 40 Russian Tupolev Tu-22M, which would allow the PLA to "saturation attack" on the U.S. carrier strike groups, helping the PLA "concentrate superior forces to fight for air superiority in the theater, at least enabling relative control over airspace in the Taiwan Strait, so as not to be overwhelmed by the swarm of U.S. fighter jets."

Regarding the use of U.S. military bases in South Korea and Japan, Hai Wei speculated that South Korea, due to its "good relations" with the People's Republic of China, might not allow the U.S. military to "use its airports to launch combat aircraft." The U.S. Pacific Air Forces' 5th Air Force, based at Kadena Air Base in Japan, would become the primary "fortress" for the U.S. and Japan during wartime. Hai Wei also noted that the PLA might target U.S. and Japanese military facilities in Japan, such as bases in Nagasaki, Yokohama, and Yokosuka, to prevent the U.S.-Japan defense of Taiwan. To avoid a "total war" between China, Japan, and the U.S., Hai Wei stated that the U.S. would "use these bases very ‘restrainedly’ (Aerial refueling, Lockheed P-3 Orion, etc.), not making them major wartime airfields, but relying more on its aircraft carrier strike groups."

After the 2010s, as the armed forces of the People's Republic of China increased, Wang Yunfei's article noted that in a military conflict not involving land targets, the PLA could complete its military objectives against the U.S. forces stationed in Japan and South Korea within three days. If the U.S. were to provide long-range assistance to Taiwan, it would need to deploy no fewer than five aircraft carrier battle group, similar to the number used in the Iraq War.

=== Military presence in Taiwan ===
In June 2004, mainstream media in Taiwan reported that U.S. military officers had arrived in Taiwan, with preparations to re-establish a U.S. military presence by 2006 to assist in the defense of Taiwan. In 2020, amid the backdrop of intensified U.S.-China confrontation, the issue of re-stationing U.S. forces in Taiwan was raised again before potential conflict in the Taiwan Strait. On March 7, Ian Easton of the "2049 Institute" wrote an op-ed titled "The U.S. Should Deploy Troops to Taiwan," advocating for the establishment of a mixed force of 1,000 personnel from the U.S. Army, Navy, Air Force, and Marine Corps to be stationed in Taiwan. In June, rumors began circulating online in Taiwan about the potential re-deployment of U.S. forces to Taiwan, with false reports claiming that U.S. troops from Germany would be transferred to Taiwan, that the number of U.S. troops would increase to 50,000, and that at least three military bases would be constructed. Reports also included claims that the Lockheed Martin F-35 Lightning II, THAAD anti-missile systems, between 5,000 and 20,000 medium-range ballistic missiles, and even nuclear weapons would be deployed.

In the September/October edition of the Military Review magazine, a series of articles focused on the theme of “China's military aggression against Taiwan.” Among them, U.S. Marine Corps Captain Walker D. Mills wrote an article titled "Deterring the Dragon: Returning U.S. Forces to Taiwan". Captain Mills' article sparked attention across Taiwan's political spectrum. Researcher Ou Xifu, from the Institute for National Defense and Security Research Institute's Institute for Chinese Political-Military and Operational Concepts, wrote that Walker D. Mills' “bold suggestion, published in a U.S. military journal, was considered unthinkable until now but highlights the significant shift in the U.S. view on defending Taiwan.” Mills' proposal was seen as akin to reviving the Sino-American Mutual Defense Treaty and the Successful Combat Plan. In the combat division of labor outlined in the Successful Combat Plan, Taiwan would be responsible for ground combat, while the U.S. would handle air defense, naval surface operations, and air force attacks.

Wang Kunyi, the chairman and professor of the Taiwan International Strategic Studies Association, also wrote that if U.S. forces were to re-deploy to Taiwan, it would trigger war, ultimately leading to "millions of deaths." In an article written earlier in 2004, Wang Yifeng described the re-deployment of U.S. forces to Taiwan as essentially tearing up the Three Communiqués, which would inevitably lead not only to a confrontation across the Taiwan Strait, but also to a complete breakdown in U.S.-China relations, creating a major global crisis.

On October 22, 2020, the Center for Strategic and International Studies (CSIS) held a seminar in Washington, D.C. Former Chairman of the American Institute in Taiwan (AIT) Richard Bush stated that the re-deployment of U.S. forces to Taiwan would undermine the conditions set for the normalization of U.S.-China relations in the 1970s (the Three Communiqués). He speculated that this would put enormous pressure on Beijing, possibly leading China to demand the termination or cancellation of diplomatic relations with the United States.

=== Non-military measures ===
China, being the second-largest economy in the world after the United States, heavily depends on international markets for its economic growth. In the financial sector, there is widespread belief that the U.S. government has the capability to impose a financial blockade on China, potentially removing it from the SWIFT system, which is the global payment and settlement network dominated by the U.S. dollar. A 2020 report from Guotai Junan, a Chinese investment bank, estimated that if China were cut off from SWIFT, it could lose up to $300 billion in trade, over $90 billion in foreign direct investment, and $80 billion in outward investment annually. However, experts note that the likelihood of China being excluded from SWIFT is low, given the potential risks it could pose to both the U.S. and global economies. Articles on the Voice of America website related to the China–United States trade war indicated that, much like North Korea and Iran, China's exclusion from SWIFT would introduce considerable economic instability worldwide. Nevertheless, Chinese officials and research institutions continue to discuss the potential consequences of such an action and measures to mitigate risks. In response to this possibility, China has been developing its own payment systems.

In 2015, the People's Bank of China launched the Cross-Border Interbank Payment System (CIPS) to reduce dependency on SWIFT. Furthermore, Taiwanese authors, citing China's economic strength and the U.S. government's relatively passive stance during Hong Kong's anti-extradition protests, suggest that the U.S. may not resort to military intervention or non-military actions like economic sanctions if China were to use force against Taiwan.

A 2020 article from The New York Times Chinese Edition pointed out that China could address food and oil security concerns by increasing its domestic food production, building up oil reserves, and securing long-term oil supply contracts with producing countries. In the face of economic sanctions, the Chinese government plans to focus on reducing its reliance on overseas markets and critical technologies by transitioning to an "internal circulation" model over the next 15 years. This self-reliance strategy, embedded in China's 14th Five-Year Plan and Vision 2035 goals, reflects a war preparedness consideration, enabling China to weather potential Western blockades.

On June 16, 2022, U.S. Senate Committee on Foreign Relations Robert Menendez (D) and Lindsey Graham (R) introduced the Taiwan Policy Act of 2022. The bill includes measures such as imposing sanctions on China in the event of an invasion of Taiwan, providing $4.5 billion in aid to Taiwan over four years, granting Taiwan the status of a "Major Non-NATO Ally," and renaming the "Taipei Economic and Cultural Representative Office" in Washington to the "Taiwan Representative Office." These steps signify a significant strengthening of U.S. commitment to Taiwan, reflecting the ongoing geopolitical tensions in the region.

=== Intelligence cooperation ===
Since the mid-1980s, the U.S. National Security Agency and Taiwan's National Security Bureau have jointly operated a signals intelligence (SIGINT) listening station at Yangmingshan.

== Various perspectives ==
=== Republic of China (Taiwan) ===
In late September 2020, a poll conducted by the Taiwanese Public Opinion Foundation revealed that 60% of Taiwanese adults over the age of 20 believed that the U.S. would likely intervene militarily to defend Taiwan if China were to use force against Taiwan, while 33% disagreed. The chairman of the Taiwan Public Opinion Foundation, Michael You, stated that this finding shows that the vast majority of Taiwanese people believe that if China uses force against Taiwan, the U.S. may come to Taiwan's defense.

In a poll conducted by ETtoday News Cloud in October 2020, assuming a military conflict across the Taiwan Strait, 54.0% of respondents believed that the U.S. would defend Taiwan, while 35.0% did not believe so. Moreover, 55.7% of respondents supported a more radical stance of "U.S. troops stationed in Taiwan to defend Taiwan," while 30.7% did not. A December 2020 poll showed that 48.0% of respondents believed that U.S. President-elect Joe Biden would not defend Taiwan. However, a March 2022 poll conducted after the outbreak of the Russia-Ukraine war revealed that 55.9% of respondents believed the U.S. would not intervene militarily to defend Taiwan.

In an article published in 2008, Associate Professor Zhang Ziyang of Nanhua University argued that "Taiwan is full of confidence in U.S. defense of Taiwan," but this confidence is largely based on U.S. misinformation. Specifically, Taiwan assumes that it holds high strategic importance for the U.S., while the quality of U.S. arms sales to Taiwan is low, leading Taiwan to reasonably assume that the U.S. would come to its defense. He further noted that "Taiwan’s excessive confidence in U.S. defense" leads China to reasonably question whether the U.S. has made a secret commitment to Taiwan. This is especially true with the installation of long-range early warning radar systems, which makes Taiwan a part of the U.S. early warning system. China thus has more reason to doubt whether the U.S. and Taiwan have secretly committed to assisting each other in defending their national security.

On February 19, 2021, in response to the U.S. Congressional proposal of the "Taiwan Invasion Prevention Act," the spokesperson for Taiwan's Ministry of Foreign Affairs, Ou Jiang'an, expressed gratitude to the U.S. Congress for the various pro-Taiwan actions taken by members of both the Senate and the House of Representatives. He highlighted that this demonstrated a strong commitment to Taiwan's security and regional peace and stability, and strongly supported Taiwan-U.S. military and security cooperation.

=== People's Republic of China (PRC) ===
The People's Republic of China, particularly the People's Liberation Army Navy, views Taiwan is viewed as geostrategically important as a gateway to the wider Pacific Ocean. Chinese author Hai Wei believes that militarily, if China can achieve its strategic objective of effectively preventing U.S. defense assistance to Taiwan, "liberation of Taiwan will just be a matter of time." Other authors politically link this issue with the Taiwan independence movement, describing pro-independence elements as "emboldened by an important lifeline" and as a result of "frequent mistaken signals, especially from the U.S."

On October 6, 2020, the Kuomintang (KMT) legislative caucus proposed and passed two motions in the Legislative Yuan: "The government should request U.S. security assistance in resisting the Communist Party," and "Resumption of Taiwan-U.S. diplomatic relations." In response, Global Times, the Chinese state-run media, published an editorial condemning these motions, calling them "proposals to promote U.S. military defense of Taiwan" and "resumption of Taiwan-U.S. diplomatic relations." The article asserted that "Regardless of the motivations, both proposals are of a 'Taiwan independence' nature and must be strongly condemned."
