= List of United States presidential visits to Sub-Saharan Africa =

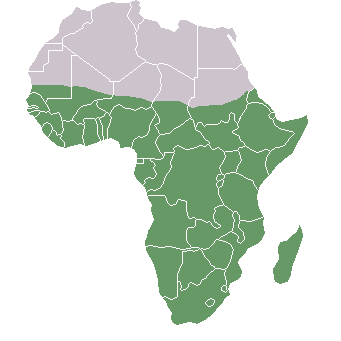
The countries of Sub-Saharan Africa.

Seven United States presidents have made presidential visits to Sub-Saharan Africa. The first was an offshoot of Franklin D. Roosevelt's secretive World War II trip to French Morocco for the Casablanca Conference. Of the 46 African nations identified as sub-Saharan by the United Nations, 16 have been visited by an American president.

== Table of visits ==
President	Dates	Country or territory	Locations	Key details
Franklin D. Roosevelt	January 13, 1943	Gambia	Bathurst	Overnight stop en route to Casablanca.
Franklin D. Roosevelt	January 25, 1943	Gambia	Bathurst	Overnight stop en route from Casablanca.
Franklin D. Roosevelt	January 26–27, 1943	Liberia	Monrovia	Informal visit; met with President Edwin Barclay.
Franklin D. Roosevelt	December 9, 1943	(France) French West Africa	Dakar	Stopped en route home to U.S. after conferring with General Dwight D. Eisenhower in Tunis, Tunisia, following Tehran Conference and Second Cairo Conference.
Jimmy Carter	March 31–April 3, 1978	Nigeria	Lagos	State visit; Met with President Olusegun Obasanjo.
Jimmy Carter	April 3, 1978	Liberia	Monrovia	Met with President William R. Tolbert, Jr.
George H. W. Bush	December 31, 1992–January 2, 1993	Somalia	Mogadishu, Baidoa, Baledogle Airfield	Visited international relief workers and U.S. military personnel.
Bill Clinton	March 23, 1998	Ghana	Accra	Met with President Jerry Rawlings; visited a Peace Corps project.
Bill Clinton	March 23–25, 1998	Uganda	Kampala, Kisowera, Mukono, Wanyange, Entebbe	Met with President Yoweri Museveni and with the Presidents of Ethiopia, Rwanda, Tanzania, Kenya, and the Democratic Republic of the Congo.
Bill Clinton	March 25, 1998	Rwanda	Kigali	Met with President Pasteur Bizimungu; delivered a public address.
Bill Clinton	March 25–29, 1998	South Africa	Cape Town, Johannesburg	Met with President Nelson Mandela; addressed joint session of Parliament.
Bill Clinton	March 29–31, 1998	Botswana	Gaborone, Kasane	Met with President Quett Masire; visited Chobe National Park.
Bill Clinton	March 31–April 2, 1998	Senegal	Dakar, Thies, Goree Island	Met with President Abdou Diouf; visited Senegalese peacekeeping troops; delivered several public addresses.
Bill Clinton	August 26–28, 2000	Nigeria	Abuja, Ushafa, Abuja	Met with President Obasanjo and addressed the National Assembly.
Bill Clinton	August 28–29, 2000	Tanzania	Arusha	Met with former South African President Mandela to promote a peace agreement for Burundi; also met with President Benjamin Mkapa.
George W. Bush	July 8, 2003	Senegal	Dakar, Goree Island	Met with President Abdoulaye Wade.
George W. Bush	July 8–11, 2003	South Africa	Pretoria	Met with President Thabo Mbeki.
George W. Bush	July 10, 2003	Botswana	Gaborone	Met with President Festus Mogae. Toured Mokolodi Nature Reserve.
George W. Bush	July 11, 2003	Uganda	Kampala	Met with President Yoweri Museveni.
George W. Bush	July 11–12, 2003	Nigeria	Abuja	Met with President Olusegun Obasanjo.
George W. Bush	February 16, 2008	Benin	Cotonou	Met with President Yayi Boni.
George W. Bush	February 16–19, 2008	Tanzania	Dar es Salaam, Arusha	Met with President Jakaya Kikwete, signed Millenimum Challenge agreement.
George W. Bush	February 19, 2008	Rwanda	Kigali	Met with President Paul Kagame and dedicated new embassy.
George W. Bush	February 19–21, 2008	Ghana	Accra	Met with President John Kufuor.
George W. Bush	February 21, 2008	Liberia	Monrovia	Met with President Ellen Johnson Sirleaf.
Barack Obama	July 10–11, 2009	Ghana	Accra	Met with President John Atta Mills. Delivered a speech to the Ghanaian Parliament. Toured a former departing point of the trans-Atlantic slave trade, the Cape Coast Castle.
Barack Obama	June 26–28, 2013	Senegal	Dakar	Met with President Macky Sall.
Barack Obama	June 28–July 1, 2013	South Africa	Johannesburg, Pretoria, Soweto, Cape Town	Met with President Jacob Zuma and with members of the Mandela family; gave a speech on trade and investment, development, democracy and security partnerships; visited Robben Island.
Barack Obama	July 1–2, 2013	Tanzania	Dar es Salaam	Met with President Jakaya Kikwete. Laid a wreath at the memorial to the 1998 United States embassy bombing. Participated in trade and investment discussions; accompanied by business leaders.
Barack Obama	July 2, 2013	Senegal	Dakar	Stopped during return to Washington D.C.
Barack Obama	December 9–11, 2013	South Africa	Johannesburg	Attended the memorial service for former President Nelson Mandela.
Barack Obama	July 24–26, 2015	Kenya	Nairobi	Attended the 2015 Global Entrepreneurship Summit. Also met with President Uhuru Kenyatta.
Barack Obama	July 26–28, 2015	Ethiopia	Addis Ababa	Met with the government of Ethiopia and addressed the African Union.
Joe Biden	December 2, 2024	Cabo Verde	Sal	Met with Prime Minister Ulisses Correia e Silva.
Joe Biden	December 2–4, 2024	Angola	Luanda Province	Met with President João Lourenço and hosted G7 summit on Lobito Trans-Africa Corridor.

== See also ==
- Foreign policy of the United States
- Foreign relations of the United States
