= Mutual Defense Treaty between the United States and the Republic of China =

1955–1979 defense treaty between the United States and the Republic of China (Taiwan)

Mutual Defense Treaty between the United States of America and the Republic of China 中華民國與美利堅合眾國間共同防禦條約
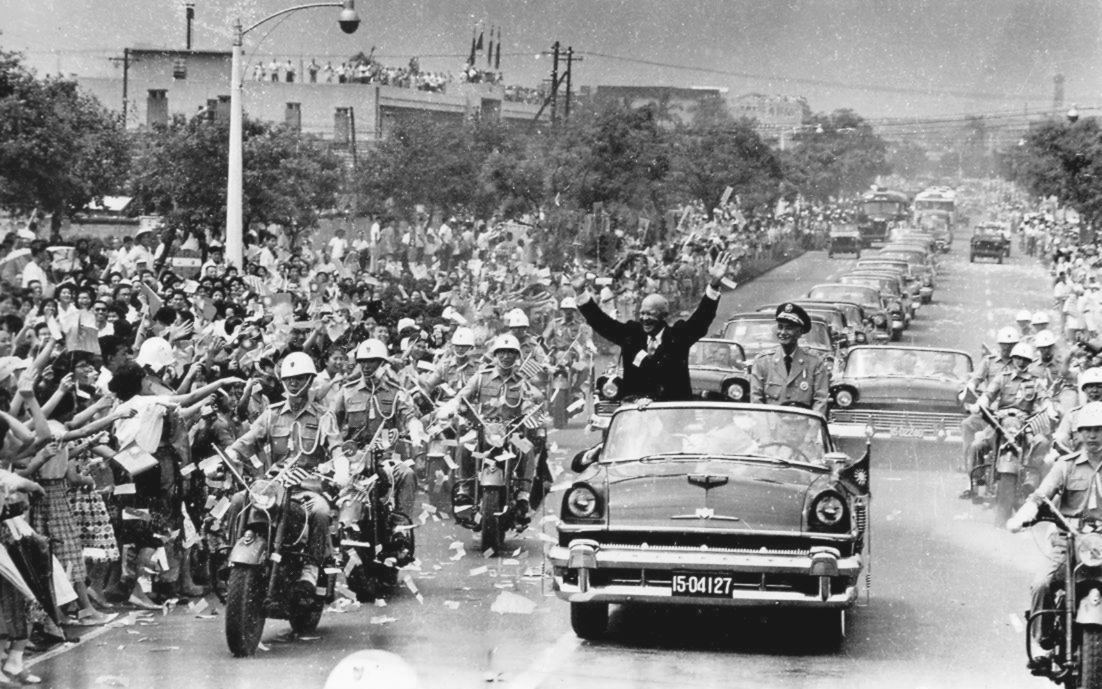
- Five years after the agreement is signed, U.S. President Dwight D. Eisenhower greets crowds in Taipei while on parade with Republic of China leader Chiang Kai-shek.
- Type: Defense Treaty
- Signed: 2 December 1954
- Location: Washington, D.C.
- Effective: 3 March 1955
- Expiry: 31 December 1979
- Parties: United States; Nationalist China
- Citations: 6 U.S.T. 433; T.I.A.S. No. 3178
- Languages: English; Chinese

Mutual Defense Treaty between the United States and the Republic of China
- Traditional Chinese: 中美共同防禦條約
- Simplified Chinese: 中美共同防御条约
Transcriptions
Standard Mandarin
- Hanyu Pinyin: Zhōng Měi Gòngtóng Fángyù Tiáoyuē

The Mutual Defense Treaty between the United States and the Republic of China was a defense pact signed between the United States and Nationalist China (Taiwan) effective from 1955 to 1979. It was intended to defend the island of Taiwan from invasion by the People's Republic of China. Some of its content was carried over to the Taiwan Relations Act of 1979 after the failure of the Goldwater v. Carter lawsuit.

== Background ==
In the context of Cold War confrontation between capitalist countries and communist countries worldwide, the mutual defense treaty between the United States of America and the Republic of China was intended to secure the island of Taiwan from potential invasion by the People's Republic of China in the aftermath of the Chinese Civil War on mainland China.

Unlike the multilateral approach used in Europe with NATO, the United States adopted a bilateral strategy for its alliances and treaties in East Asia, forming separate agreements with the Philippines, the Republic of China, Japan, and the Republic of Korea. This arrangement became known as the San Francisco System or the hubs-and-spokes system. Because the politics in Asia ranged from democratic to authoritarian, it would be difficult to find a base for multilateral relations stemming from shared values. Furthermore, Asian countries were not perceived to face a single threat, unlike Western Europe from the Soviet Union. It was therefore considered more beneficial to pursue bilateral relations.

The treaty was signed on December 2, 1954, in Washington, D.C., and came into force on March 3, 1955.

The treaty supported the Republic of China in asserting legitimacy as the sole government of the whole of mainland China until the early 1970s. During the Cold War, the treaty also helped US policymakers to shape the policy of containment in East Asia, together with South Korea and Japan, against the potential spread of communism.

== Obligations ==
The Badge of the United States Taiwan Defense Command (USTDC, 1955–1979)

The Badge of MAAG, Taiwan (1951–1979)

The treaty consisted of ten main articles. The content of the treaty included the provision that if one country came under attack, the other would aid and provide military support.

The treaty was limited in application to the defense of the island of Taiwan and the Pescadores only. Kinmen and Matsu were not protected by this treaty. Therefore, the US stood aside during the Second Taiwan Strait Crisis. The treaty also discouraged the Republic of China from initiating any military action against mainland China, since only Taiwan and Pescadores were included, and unilateral military actions were not supported.

From the viewpoint of the US Senate, in conjunction with the ratification of the MDT, a report issued Feb. 8, 1955, by the US Senate Committee on Foreign Relations specified: "It is the view of the committee that the coming into force of the present treaty will not modify or affect the existing legal status of Formosa and the Pescadores."

To avoid any possibility of misunderstanding on this aspect of the treaty, the committee decided it would be useful to include in this report the following statement:

It is the understanding of the Senate that nothing in the treaty shall be construed as affecting or modifying the legal status or sovereignty of the territories to which it applies.

== Impact ==
The relationship between the US and the Soviet Union had eased, and the US did not support a "counterattack on the mainland." The Republic of China Armed Forces continued to counterattack on a small scale, with more defeats and fewer victories. As a result, the national army is considered to missed three major opportunities (the Great Leap Forward in 1958, the Sino-Indian border conflict in 1962, and the Cultural Revolution in 1966, the Sino-Indian border conflict in 1967) which completely stifled the hope of the Republic of China's government to counterattack the mainland.

The benefits of this treaty were not limited to Taiwan and the United States. Still, they extended to the entire Western Pacific, which is slightly different from the US-Japan Cooperation and Security Treaty and the US-Philippines Mutual Defense Treaty. The treaty stipulated that, in addition to self-defense, military actions taken by the Republic of China on Taiwan against mainland China should also comply with restrictions agreed by the United States. Truman restored the policy of neutrality across the Taiwan Strait to a certain extent.

The treaty prevented the CCP from attacking Taiwan and established the situation of long-term division of both sides of the Taiwan Strait. U.S. troops were stationed in Taiwan to establish military security to ensure Taiwan's development and turn Taiwan's crisis into peace.

== Termination ==
Although the treaty had no time limit, Article 10 of the treaty stipulated that either party could terminate the treaty one year after notifying the other party. Accordingly, the treaty came to an end on January 1, 1980, one year after the United States established diplomatic relations with the People's Republic of China on January 1, 1979.

The authority for President Jimmy Carter to unilaterally annul a treaty, in this case, America's treaty with the Republic of China, was the topic of the Supreme Court case Goldwater v. Carter in which the court declined to rule on the legality of this action on jurisdictional grounds, thereby allowing it to proceed.

== Taiwan Relations Act ==
Shortly after the United States recognized the People's Republic of China, the U.S. Congress passed the Taiwan Relations Act. Some of the treaty's content survives in the Act; for example, the definition of "Taiwan". However, it falls short of promising Taiwan direct military assistance in case of an invasion.

== See also ==
- American defense of Taiwan
- Battle of Guningtou
- Political status of Taiwan
- Sino-American Cooperative Organization, during World War II
- Taiwan Relations Act
- Taiwan Travel Act of 2018
- United States Taiwan Defense Command
