= Goldwater v. Carter =

- Supreme Court of the United States

Decided December 13, 1979
- Full case name: Barry Goldwater, et al. v. James Earl Carter, President of the United States, et al.
- Citations: 444 U.S. 996 (more) 100 S. Ct. 533; 62 L. Ed. 2d 428; 1979 U.S. LEXIS 4144

Case history
- Prior: Judgment for defendants, 481 F. Supp. 949 (D.D.C. 1979); reversed, 617 F.2d 697 (D.C. Cir. 1979)

Holding
- Whether President Carter could unilaterally break a defense treaty with Taiwan without Senate approval was a political question and could not be reviewed by the court, as Congress had not issued a formal opposition. The case was dismissed.

Court membership
- Chief Justice Warren E. Burger Associate Justices William J. Brennan Jr. · Potter Stewart; Byron White · Thurgood Marshall; Harry Blackmun · Lewis F. Powell Jr. William Rehnquist · John P. Stevens

Case opinions
- Per curiam
- Concurrence: Marshall
- Concurrence: Powell
- Concurrence: Rehnquist, joined by Burger, Stewart, Stevens
- Dissent: Blackmun (in part), joined by White
- Dissent: Brennan

Laws applied
- U.S. Const. art. II, sct. II

Goldwater v. Carter, 444 U.S. 996 (1979), was a United States Supreme Court case in which the Court dismissed a lawsuit filed by Senator Barry Goldwater and other members of the United States Congress challenging the right of President Jimmy Carter to unilaterally nullify the Sino-American Mutual Defense Treaty, which the United States had signed with the Republic of China, so that relations could instead be established with the People's Republic of China.

Goldwater and his co-filers claimed that the President required Senate approval to take such an action, under Article II, Section II of the U.S. Constitution, and that, by not doing so, President Carter had acted beyond the powers of his office. While dismissing the case the Court left open the question of the constitutionality of President Carter's actions.

Granting a petition for certiorari but without hearing oral arguments, the court vacated a court of appeals ruling on December 13, 1979, and remanded the case to a federal district court with directions to dismiss the complaint. A majority of six Justices ruled that the case should be dismissed without hearing an oral argument. Justices Lewis Powell and William Rehnquist issued two separate concurring opinions on the case. Rehnquist claimed that the issue concerned how foreign affairs were conducted between Congress and the President, and was essentially political, not judicial; therefore, it was not eligible to be heard by the court. Powell, while agreeing that the case did not merit judicial review, believed that the issue itself, the powers of the President to break treaties without congressional approval, would have been arguable had Congress issued a formal opposition through a resolution to the termination of the treaty. (The Senate had drafted such a resolution, but had not voted upon it.) This would have turned the case into a constitutional debate between the executive powers granted to the President and the legislative powers granted to Congress. As the case stood, however, it was simply a dispute among unsettled, competing political forces within the legislative and executive branches of government, and hence still political in nature due to the lack of majority or supermajority vote in the Senate speaking officially as a constitutional institution.

== U.S. Court of Appeals for the District of Columbia ==
In 1978, Senator Goldwater filed with the United States Court of Appeals for the District of Columbia Circuit.

The plaintiffs included Senators Barry Goldwater, Strom Thurmond, Carl Curtis, Jake Garn, Orrin Hatch, Jesse A. Helms; Senator-Elect Gordon Humphrey; and Congressmen Robert Bauman, Steve Symms, Larry McDonald, Robert Daniel, Bob Stump, Eldon Rudd, John Ashbrook, and George Hansen.

The defendants of the appeals court include President Jimmy Carter and Secretary of State Cyrus Vance.

== Cause of the Plaintiff's Appeal ==
The cause of the court of appeals by the plaintiffs was what the plaintiffs saw, and alleged, as the president's "unconstitutional" termination of the 1954 Defense Treaty with Republic of China, violation of Article II and Article VI of the U.S. Constitution and Public Law 95-384.

According to Professor Joshua Kastenberg at the University of New Mexico's law school in his Goldwater v. Carter: Foreign Policy, China, and the Resurgence of Executive Branch Primacy (Kansas, 2023), the alliance Goldwater built was outside of the Republican center but they argued that if a president could revoke a treaty then NATO was at risk.

== Order on Goldwater v. Carter by Judge Gasch ==
Judge Oliver Gasch upon consideration of the plaintiff's motion to alter or amend the Court's judgment on the case on June 6, 1979, gave the following orders:

1. That the plaintiff's motion to alter or mend the judgment of June 6, 1979 be granted
2. That the defendants' motion to dismiss is denied
3. That the plaintiff's cross-motion for summary judgment be granted
4. The judgment of the Court that defendant President Carter's notice of termination of the 1954 Mutual Defense Treaty Between the United States and the Republic of China must receive the approval of two-thirds of the United States Senate or a majority of both houses of Congress
5. That defendant Secretary of State Cyrus R. Vance and his subordinate officers be enjoined from taking any action to implement the President's notice of termination.

Notice of the appeal was entered on October 17, 1979, and written by Alice Daniel, Acting Assistant Attorney General and signed by Attorney David J. Anderson.

== Quotes ==
Prudential considerations persuade me that a dispute between Congress and the President is not ready for judicial review unless and until each branch has taken action asserting its constitutional authority ... The Judicial Branch should not decide issues affecting the allocation of power between the President and Congress until the political branches reach a constitutional impasse. Otherwise, we would encourage small groups or even individual Members of Congress to seek judicial resolution of issues before the normal political process has the opportunity to resolve the conflict. If the Congress, by appropriate formal action, had challenged the President's authority to terminate the treaty with Taiwan, the resulting uncertainty could have serious consequences for our country. In that situation, it would be the duty of this Court to resolve the issue.

— Justice Powell in his opinion

I am of the view that the basic question presented by the petitioners in this case is "political" and therefore nonjusticiable because it involves the authority of the President in the conduct of our country's foreign relations and the extent to which the Senate or the Congress is authorized to negate the action of the President.

— Justice Rehnquist in his opinion

The issue of decisionmaking authority must be resolved as a matter of constitutional law, not political discretion; accordingly, it falls within the competence of the courts

— Justice Brennan in his dissenting opinion

== Conclusion ==
While dismissing the case of Goldwater v. Carter, the Supreme Court left open the question of the constitutionality of President Carter's actions. In their concurrences Powell and Rehnquist merely questioned the judicial merit of the case itself; they did not explicitly approve Carter's action. Moreover, Powell even stated that this could be a valid constitutional issue. Four of the justices objected to the "indefensible" decision that the case could be disposed of without oral argument.

Article II, Section II of the Constitution merely states that the President cannot make treaties without a Senate majority two-thirds vote. As it stands now, there is no official ruling on whether the President has the power to break a treaty without the approval of Congress.

== See also ==
- List of United States Supreme Court cases, volume 444
