= Negotiation =

Dialogue intended to reach an agreement

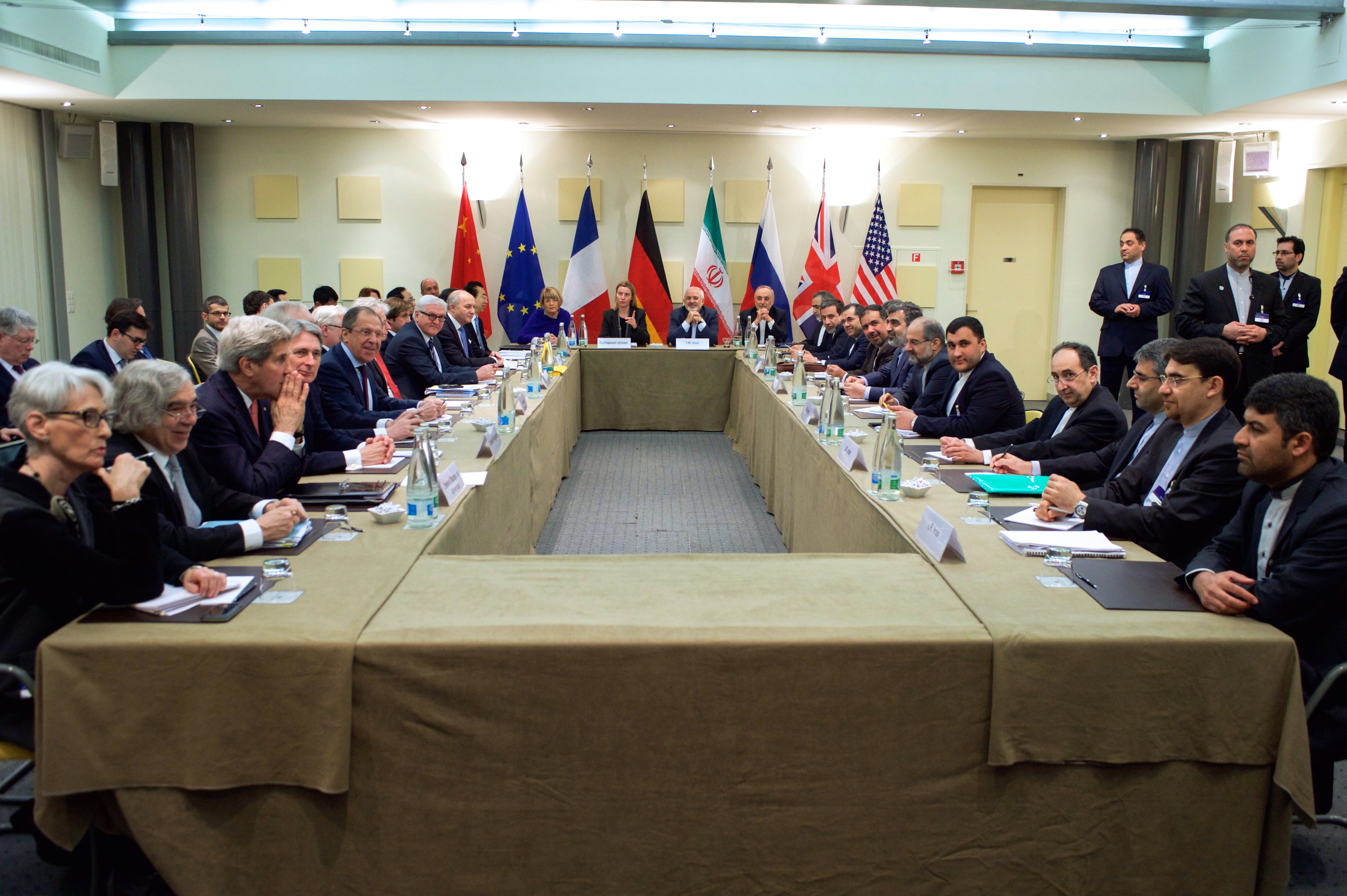
The ministers of foreign affairs of the United States, the United Kingdom, Russia, Germany, France, China, the European Union and Iran negotiating in Lausanne for a Comprehensive agreement on the Iranian nuclear programme (30 March 2015)

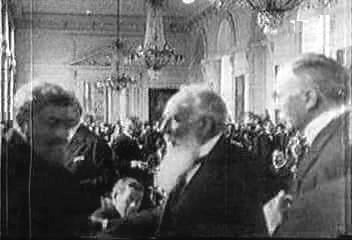
Signing the Treaty of Trianon on 4 June 1920. Hungary's Albert Apponyi is standing in the middle.

Negotiation is a dialogue between two or more parties to resolve points of difference, gain an advantage for an individual or collective, or craft outcomes to satisfy various interests. The parties aspire to agree on matters of mutual interest. The agreement can be beneficial for all or some of the parties involved. The negotiators should establish their own needs and wants while also seeking to understand the wants and needs of others involved to increase their chances of closing deals, avoiding conflicts, forming relationships with other parties, or maximizing mutual gains. Distributive negotiations, or compromises, are conducted by putting forward a position and making concessions to achieve an agreement. The degree to which the negotiating parties trust each other to implement the negotiated solution is a major factor in determining the success of a negotiation.

People negotiate daily, often without considering it a negotiation. Negotiations may occur in organizations, including businesses, non-profits, and governments, as well as in purchasing and sales, legal proceedings, and personal situations such as marriage, divorce, parenting, friendship, etc. Professional negotiators are often specialized. Examples of professional negotiators include union negotiators, leverage buyout negotiators, peace negotiators, and hostage negotiators. They may also work under other titles, such as diplomats, legislators, or arbitrators. Negotiations may also be conducted by algorithms or machines in what is known as automated negotiation. In automated negotiation, the participants and process have to be modeled correctly.

== Etymology ==
The word "negotiation" originated in the early 15th century from the Old French negociacion from Latin negotiatio from neg- "no" and otium "leisure". These terms mean "business, trade, traffic". By the late 1570s negotiation had the definition, "to communicate in search of mutual agreement". With this new introduction and this meaning, it showed a shift from "doing business" to "bargaining about" business.

== Types ==
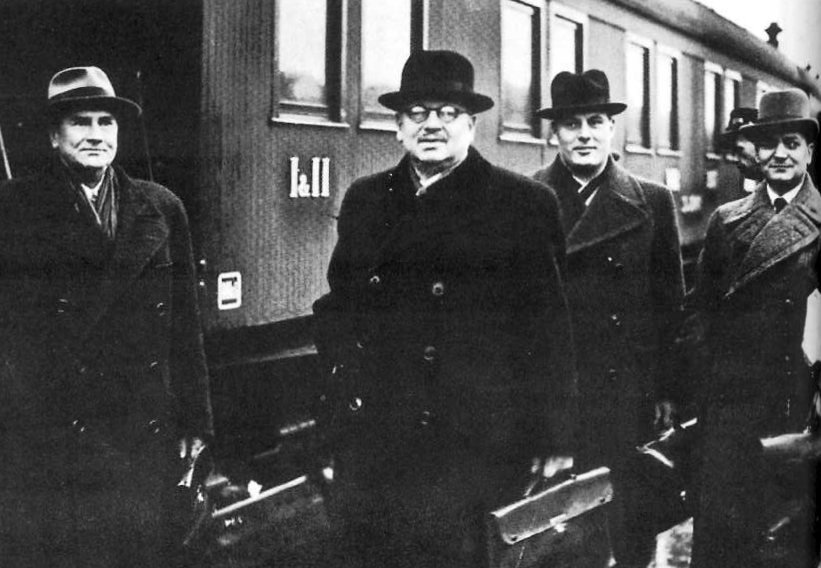
J. K. Paasikivi, Finnish Counselor of State and the future President of Finland, arrived from negotiations in Moscow on 16 October 1939. From left to right: Aarno Yrjö-Koskinen, Paasikivi, Johan Nykopp and Aladár Paasonen.

Negotiation can take a variety of forms in different contexts. These may include conferences between members of the United Nations to establish international norms, meetings between combatants to end a military conflict, meetings between representatives of businesses to bring about a transaction, and conversations between parents about how to manage childcare. Mediation is a form of negotiation where a third party helps the conflicting parties negotiate, usually when they are unable to do so by themselves. Mediated negotiation can be contrasted with arbitration, where conflicting parties commit to accepting the decision of a third party. Negotiations in the workplace can impact the entire organization's performance.

Negotiation theorists generally distinguish between two primary types of negotiation: distributive negotiation and integrative negotiation. The type of negotiation that takes place is dependent on the mindset of the negotiators and the situation of the negotiation. For example, one-off encounters where lasting relationships do not occur are more likely to produce distributive negotiations whereas lasting relationships are more likely to require integrative negotiating. Theorists vary in their labeling and definition of these two fundamental types.

=== Distributive negotiation ===
The total of advantages and disadvantages to be distributed in a negotiation can illustrated with the term "negotiation pie". The course of the negotiation can either lead to an increase, shrinking, or stagnation of these values. If the negotiating parties can expand the total pie, a win-win situation is possible, assuming that both parties profit from the expansion of the pie. In practice, however, this maximization approach is oftentimes impeded by the so-called small pie bias, i.e. the psychological underestimation of the negotiation pie's size. Likewise, the possibility to increase the pie may be underestimated due to the so-called incompatibility bias. Contrary to enlarging the pie, the pie may also shrink during negotiations e.g. due to (excessive) negotiation costs.

Distributive negotiation (also known as win-lose game), compromise, positional negotiation, or hard-bargaining negotiation attempts to distribute a "fixed pie" of benefits. Distributive negotiation operates under zero-sum conditions, where it is assumed that any gain made by one party will be at the expense of the other. Haggling over prices on an open market, as in the purchase of a car or home, is an example of distributive negotiation.

In a distributive negotiation, each side often adopts an extreme or fixed position that they know will not be accepted, and then seeks to cede as little as possible before reaching a deal. Distributive bargainers conceive of negotiation as a process of distributing a fixed amount of value. A distributive negotiation often involves people who have never had a previous interactive relationship with each other and are unlikely to do so again shortly, although all negotiations usually have some distributive element. Since prospect theory indicates that people tend to prioritize the minimization of losses over the maximization of gains, this form of negotiation is likely to be more acrimonious and less productive in agreement.

=== Integrative negotiation ===
Integrative negotiation is also called interest-based, merit-based, win-win, or principled negotiation. It is a set of techniques that attempts to improve the quality and likelihood of negotiated agreement by taking advantage of the fact that different parties often value various outcomes differently. While distributive negotiation assumes there is a fixed amount of value (a "fixed pie") to be divided between the parties, integrative negotiation attempts to create value in the course of the negotiation ("expand the pie") by either "compensating" the loss of one item with gains from another ("trade-offs" or logrolling), or by constructing or reframing the issues of the conflict in such a way that both parties benefit ("win-win" negotiation).

However, even integrative negotiation is likely to have some distributive elements, especially when the different parties value some items to the same degree or when details are left to be allocated at the end of the negotiation. While concession by at least one party is always necessary for negotiations, research shows that people who concede more quickly are less likely to explore all integrative and mutually beneficial solutions. Therefore, early concession reduces the chance of an integrative negotiation.

Integrative negotiation often involves a higher degree of trust and the formation of a relationship, although INSEAD professor Horacio Falcao has stated that, counter-intuitively, trust is a helpful aid to successful win-win negotiation but not a necessary requirement: he argues that promotion of interdependence is a more effective strategy that development of trust. Integrative negotiation can also involve creative problem-solving in the pursuit of mutual gains. It sees a good agreement as one that provides optimal gain for both parties, rather than maximum individual gain. Each party seeks to allow the other party sufficient benefit that both will hold to the agreement.

Productive negotiation focuses on the underlying interests of both parties rather than their starting positions and approaches negotiation as a shared problem-solving exercise rather than an individualized battle. Adherence to objective and principled criteria is the basis for productive negotiation and agreement.

=== Text-based negotiation ===
Text-based negotiation refers to the process of working up the text of an agreement that all parties are willing to accept and sign. Negotiating parties may begin with a draft text, consider new textual suggestions, and work to find the middle ground among various differing positions.

Common examples of text-based negotiation include the redaction of a constitution, law or sentence by a constitutional assembly, legislature or court respectively. Other more specific examples are United Nations' negotiation regarding the reform of the UN Security Council and the formation of the international agreement underpinning the Regional Comprehensive Economic Partnership (RCEP) in the Asia-Pacific Region, where the parties involved failed in 2019 to agree on a text which would suit India.

Such negotiations are often founded on the principle that "nothing is agreed until everything is agreed". For example, this principle, also known as the single undertaking approach, is often used in World Trade Organization negotiations, although some negotiations relax this requirement. The principle formed part of the British negotiating approach for the Brexit deal following the UK's withdrawal from the European Union.

=== Integrated negotiation ===
Integrated negotiation is a strategic attempt to maximize value in any single negotiation through the astute linking and sequencing of other negotiations and decisions related to one's operating activities.

This approach in complex settings is executed by mapping out all potentially relevant negotiations, conflicts, and operating decisions to integrate helpful connections among them while minimizing any potentially harmful connections (see examples below).

Integrated negotiation is not to be confused with integrative negotiation, a different concept (as outlined above) related to a non-zero-sum approach to creating value in negotiations.

Integrated negotiation was first identified and labeled by the international negotiator and author Peter Johnston in his book Negotiating with Giants.

One of the examples cited in Johnston's book is that of J. D. Rockefeller deciding where to build his first major oil refinery. Instead of taking the easier, cheaper route from the oil fields to refine his petroleum in Pittsburgh, Rockefeller chose to build his refinery in Cleveland, because he recognized that he would have to negotiate with the rail companies transporting his refined oil to market. Pittsburgh had just one major railroad, which would therefore be able to dictate prices in negotiations, while Cleveland had three railroads that Rockefeller knew would compete for his business, potentially reducing his costs significantly. The leverage gained in these rail negotiations more than offset the additional operating costs of sending his oil to Cleveland for refining, helping establish Rockefeller's empire, while undermining his competitors who failed to integrate their core operating decisions with their negotiation strategies.

Other examples of integrated negotiation include the following:

- In sports, athletes in the final year of their contracts will ideally hit peak performance so they can negotiate robust, long-term contracts in their favor.
- A union needs to negotiate and resolve any significant internal conflicts to maximize its collective clout before going to the table to negotiate a new contract with management.
- If purchases for similar goods or services are occurring independently of one another across different government departments, recognizing this and consolidating orders into one large volume purchase can help create buying leverage and cost savings in negotiations with suppliers.
- A tech start-up looking to negotiate being bought out by a larger industry player in the future can improve its odds of that happening by ensuring, wherever possible, that its systems, technology, competencies, and culture are as compatible as possible with those of its most likely buyer.
- A politician negotiating support for a presidential run may want to avoid bringing on board any high-profile supporters who risk alienating other important potential supporters while avoiding any unexpected new policies that could also limit the size of their growing coalition.

=== Sole source negotiation ===
Sole source negotiation arises when a buyer has no apparent alternatives but to purchase from a specific supplier or attempt to secure a better deal without any alternative.

== Bad faith ==
When a party pretends to negotiate but secretly has no intention of compromising, the party is negotiating in bad faith; for example, when a political party sees political benefit in appearing to negotiate without having any intention of making the compromises necessary to settle.

Bad faith negotiations are often used in political science and political psychology to refer to negotiating strategies in which there is no real intention to reach compromise or a model of information processing. The "inherent bad faith model" of information processing is a theory in political psychology that was first put forth by Ole Holsti to explain the relationship between John Foster Dulles' beliefs and his model of information processing. It is the most widely studied model of one's opponent. A state is presumed implacably hostile, and contra-indicators of this are ignored. They are dismissed as propaganda ploys or signs of weakness. An example is John Foster Dulles' position regarding the Soviet Union.

== International negotiation ==
Due to different cultural lenses, negotiation styles differ worldwide. These differences comprise among others how the parties exchange information, the use of different strategies, conceptions of the nature of negotiation, the use of power, the use of options. Negotiations as they are often taught and used by practitioners in "Western" countries may not be effective or may even be counterproductive in "non-Western" countries – such as Asian countries. These cultural differences can lead to misunderstandings, misinterpretations, and conflicts that hinder effective deal-making. Overcoming these barriers requires cultural awareness, adaptability, and strategic communication.

== Strategies ==
There are many different ways to categorize the essential elements of negotiation.

One view of negotiation involves three basic elements: process, behavior, and substance. The process refers to how the parties negotiate: the context of the negotiations, the parties to the negotiations, the tactics used by the parties, and the sequence and stages in which all of these play out. Behavior refers to the relationships among these parties, the communication between them, and the styles they adopt. The substance refers to what the parties negotiate over: the agenda, the issues (positions and – more helpfully – interests), the options, and the agreement(s) reached at the end.

Another view of negotiation comprises four elements: strategy, process, tools, and tactics. The strategy comprises top-level goals, which typically include the relationship and the intended outcome. Processes and tools include the steps to follow and roles to take in preparing for and negotiating with the other parties. Tactics include more detailed statements and actions and responses to others' statements and actions. Some add to this persuasion and influence, asserting that these have become integral to modern-day negotiation success, and so should not be omitted.

Strategic approaches to concession-making include consideration of the optimum time to make a concession, making concessions in installments, not all at once, and ensuring that the opponent is aware that a concession has been made, rather than a re-expression of a position already outlined, and aware of the cost incurred in making the concession, especially where the other party is generally less aware of the nature of the business or the product being negotiated.

=== Stages in the negotiation process ===
Effective negotiation begins with planning and collating any necessary information. One aspect of planning is the development of a "best alternative to a negotiated agreement", or BATNA: the most advantageous alternative course of action that a negotiator can take, should the current negotiation end without reaching an agreement. Anticipating the possibility of being unsuccessful is therefore important. The quality of a BATNA has the potential to improve a party's negotiation outcome. Understanding one's BATNA can empower an individual and allow him or her to set higher goals when moving forward. Alternatives need to be actual and actionable to be of value. Negotiators may also consider the other party's BATNA and how it compares to what they are offering during the negotiation.

Negotiators do not need to sacrifice effective negotiation in favor of a positive relationship between parties. Rather than conceding, each side can appreciate that the other has emotions and motivations of their own and use this to their advantage in discussing the issue. Understanding perspectives can help move parties toward a more integrative solution. Fisher et al. illustrate a few techniques that effectively improve perspective-taking in the book Getting to Yes, and through the following, negotiators can separate people from the problem itself:

- Put yourself in their shoes – People tend to search for information that confirms their own beliefs and often ignore information that contradicts prior beliefs. To negotiate effectively, it is important to empathize with the other party's point of view. One should be open to other views and attempt to approach an issue from the perspective of the other.
- Discuss each other's perceptions – A more direct approach to understanding the other party is to explicitly discuss each other's perceptions. Each individual should openly and honestly share their perceptions without assigning blame or judgment to the other.
- Find opportunities to act inconsistently with their views – The other party may have prior perceptions and expectations about the other side. The other side can act in a way that directly contradicts those preconceptions, effectively conveying that the party is interested in an integrative negotiation.
- Face-saving – This approach justifies a stance based on one's previously expressed principles and values in a negotiation. This approach to an issue is less arbitrary, and thus, it is more understandable from the opposing party's perspective.

Additionally, negotiators can use specific communication techniques to build stronger relationships and develop more meaningful negotiation solutions.

- Active listening – Listening is more than just hearing what the other side says. Active listening involves paying close attention to what is being said verbally and nonverbally. It involves periodically seeking further clarification from the person. By asking the person exactly what they mean, they may realize the negotiator takes them seriously and is not simply walking through a routine. The Australian Mosaic Project Services business commends "proactive" rather than just "active" listening, in which more emphasis is placed on the asking of questions as well as listening actively to the answers given.
- Speak for a purpose – Too much information can be as harmful as too little. Before discussing an important point, determine exactly what to communicate to the other party. Determine the exact purpose that this shared information will serve.

=== Employing an advocate ===
A skilled negotiator may serve as an advocate for one party to the negotiation. The advocate attempts to obtain the most favorable outcomes possible for that party. In this process, the negotiator attempts to determine the minimum outcome(s) the other party is (or parties are) willing to accept, then adjusts their demands accordingly. A "successful" negotiation in the advocacy approach is when the negotiator can obtain all or most of the outcomes their party desires, but without driving the other party to permanently break off negotiations.

Skilled negotiators may use a variety of tactics ranging from negotiation hypnosis to a straightforward presentation of demands or setting of preconditions, to more deceptive approaches such as cherry picking. Intimidation and salami tactics may also play a part in swaying the outcome of negotiations.

=== Consistency ===
In negotiation, consistency refers to a negotiator's strong psychological need to be consistent with prior acts and statements. The consistency principle states that people are motivated toward cognitive consistency and will change their attitudes, beliefs, perceptions and actions to achieve it. Robert Cialdini and his research team have conducted extensive research into what Cialdini refers to as the 'Consistency Principle of Persuasion'. Described in his book Influence Science and Practice, this principle states that people live up to what they have publicly said they will do and what they have written down. Cialdini encourages people to have others write down their commitments as a route to having others live up to their promises.

=== Conflict styles ===
Kenneth W. Thomas identified five styles or responses to negotiation. These five strategies have been frequently described in the literature and are based on the dual-concern model. The dual-concern model of conflict resolution is a perspective that assumes individuals' preferred method of dealing with conflict is based on two themes or dimensions:

1. A concern for self (i.e., assertiveness), and
2. A concern for others (i.e., empathy).

Based on this model, individuals balance their concern for personal needs and interests with the needs and interests of others. The following five styles can be used based on individuals' preferences, depending on their pro-self or pro-social goals. These styles can change over time, and individuals can have strong dispositions toward numerous styles.

Accommodating
Individuals who enjoy solving the other party's problems and preserving personal relationships. Accommodators are sensitive to the emotional states, body language, and verbal signals of the other parties. They can, however, feel taken advantage of in situations when the other party places little emphasis on the relationship. Accommodation is a passive but prosocial approach to conflict. People solve both large and small conflicts by giving in to the demands of others. Sometimes, they yield because they realize that their position is in error, so they agree with the viewpoint adopted by others. In other cases, however, they may withdraw their demands without really being convinced that the other side is correct, but for the sake of group unity or in the interest of time—they withdraw all complaints. Thus, yielding can reflect either genuine conversion or superficial compliance.
Avoiding
Individuals who do not like to negotiate and do not do it unless warranted. When negotiating, avoiders tend to defer and dodge the confrontational aspects of negotiating; however, they may be perceived as tactful and diplomatic. Inaction is a passive means of dealing with disputes. Those who avoid conflicts adopt a "wait and see" attitude, hoping that problems will solve themselves. Avoiders often tolerate conflicts, allowing them to simmer without doing anything to minimize them. Rather than openly discussing disagreements, people who rely on avoidance change the subject, skip meetings, or even leave the group altogether (Bayazit & Mannix, 2003). Sometimes they simply agree to disagree (a modus vivendi).
Collaborating
Individuals who enjoy negotiations that involve solving tough problems in creative ways. Collaborators are good at using negotiations to understand the concerns and interests of the other parties. Collaborating is an active, pro-social, and pro-self approach to conflict resolution. It is a cooperative approach. Collaborating people identify the issues underlying the dispute and then work together to identify a solution that is satisfying to both sides. Here, goals are important, but so is maintaining positive relationships. This orientation, which is also described as collaboration, problem solving, or a win-win orientation entreats both sides in the dispute to consider their opponent's outcomes as well as their own.
Competing
Individuals who enjoy negotiations because they present an opportunity to win something. Competitive negotiators have strong instincts for all aspects of negotiating and are often strategic. Because their style can dominate the bargaining process, competitive negotiators often neglect the importance of relationships. Competing is an active, pro-self means of dealing with conflict that involves forcing others to accept one's view. Those who use this strategy tend to see conflict as a win-lose situation and so use competitive, powerful tactics to intimidate others. Fighting (forcing, dominating, or contending) can take many forms, including authoritative mandate, challenges, arguing, insults, accusations, complaining, vengeance, and even physical violence (Morrill, 1995). These conflict resolution methods are all contentious ones because they involve imposing one's solution on the other party.
Compromising
Individuals who are eager to close the deal by doing what is fair and equal for all parties involved in the negotiation. Compromisers can be useful when there is limited time to complete the deal; however, compromisers often unnecessarily rush the negotiation process and make concessions too quickly.

=== Types of negotiators ===
Three basic kinds of negotiators have been identified by researchers involved in The Harvard Negotiation Project. These types of negotiators are soft bargainers, hard bargainers, and principled bargainers.

Soft
These people see negotiation as too close to competition, so they choose a gentle style of bargaining. The offers they make are not in their best interests, they yield to others' demands, avoid confrontation, and they maintain good relations with fellow negotiators. Their perception of others is one of friendship, and their goal is agreement. They do not separate the people from the problem but are soft on both. They avoid contests of wills and insist on the agreement, offering solutions and easily trusting others and changing their opinions.
Hard
These people use contentious strategies to influence, utilizing phrases such as "this is my final offer" and "take it or leave it". They make threats, (Note: Jim Anderson notes that threats brought forward in a negotiation often linger beyond the point of their intended use.) are distrustful of others, insist on their position, and apply pressure to negotiate. They see others as adversaries and their ultimate goal is victory. Additionally, they search for one single answer and insist you agree with it. They do not separate the people from the problem (as with soft bargainers), but they are hard on both the people involved and the problem.
Principled
Individuals who bargain this way seek integrative solutions and do so by sidestepping commitment to specific positions. They focus on the problem rather than the intentions, motives, and needs of the people involved. They separate the people from the problem, explore interests, avoid bottom lines, and reach results based on standards independent of personal will. They base their choices on objective criteria rather than power, pressure, self-interest, or an arbitrary decisional procedure. These criteria may be drawn from moral standards, principles of fairness, professional standards, and tradition.

Researchers from The Harvard Negotiation Project recommend that negotiators explore several tactics to reach the best solution for their problems, but this is often not the case (as when you may be dealing with an individual using soft or hard-bargaining tactics) (Forsyth, 2010).

== Tactics ==
Tactics are always an important part of the negotiating process. More often than not they are subtle, difficult to identify, and used for multiple purposes. Tactics are more frequently used in distributive negotiations and when the focus is on taking as much value off the table as possible. Many negotiating tactics exist: below are a few commonly used tactics:

- Anchoring

Anchoring is the process of establishing a reference point first to guide the other person closer to a suggested price. It is often presented at the beginning of a negotiation to influence the rest of the negotiation. As an example, someone may want to sell a car for $50,000. Now a customer walks in saying they want to buy a car. The seller offers to sell the car for $65,000. A counteroffer would probably be $50,000–55,000. This also works and vice versa for buying something. The idea here is to narrow the other party's expectations down or up. To counter-anchoring, one should point out the fact that they are anchoring and say that they need to drive it down to an acceptable price.

- Auction: The bidding process is designed to create competition. When several parties want the same thing, one tactic is to pit them against one another. When people know that they may lose out on something, they want it even more. Not only do they want the thing that is being bid on, but they also want to win, just to win. Taking advantage of someone's competitive nature can drive up the price.
- Bogey: Negotiators use the bogey tactic to pretend that an issue of little or no importance is very important. Then, later in the negotiation, the issue can be traded for a major concession of actual importance.
- Brinkmanship: One party aggressively pursues a set of terms to the point where the other negotiating party must either agree or walk away. Brinkmanship is a type of "hard nut" approach to bargaining in which one party pushes the other party to the "brink" or edge of what that party is willing to accommodate. Successful brinkmanship convinces the other party they have no choice but to accept the offer and there is no acceptable alternative to the proposed agreement.
- Brooklyn optician: a tactic whereby a seller prices several items separately and anticipates negotiation on each of them. The eponymous Brooklyn optician would price frames and lenses separately. Another example would be separate negotiations for computers, keyboards and monitors.
- Calling a higher authority: To mitigate too far-reaching concessions, deescalate, or overcome a deadlock situation, one party makes the further negotiation process dependent on the decision of a decision maker, not present at the negotiation table.
- Chicken: Negotiators propose extreme measures often in the form of bluffs to force the other party to chicken out and give them what they want. This tactic can be dangerous when parties are unwilling to back down and go through with the extreme measure.
- Concession: One party offers up something in the hope of reaching or coming closer to an agreement. Alternatively, a negotiator can choose avoiding giving concessions and hold out in the hope that the other side will concede before they do. This tough bargaining position can maximize the negotiator's ex-post (actual) outcome. Ray Puffitt notes that negotiators can achieve "equitable" negotiation outcomes by looking for "concessions of equal weight".
- Defense in Depth: Several layers of decision-making authority is used to allow further concessions each time the agreement goes through a different level of authority. In other words, each time the offer goes to a decision-maker, that decision maker asks to add another concession to close the deal.
- Deadlines: Give the other party a deadline, forcing them to make a decision. This method uses time to apply pressure on the other party. Deadlines given can be actual or artificial.
- Flinch: Flinching is showing a strong negative physical reaction to a proposal. Common examples of flinching are gasping for air or a visible expression of surprise or shock. The flinch can be done consciously or unconsciously. The flinch signals to the opposite party that you think the offer or proposal is absurd in hopes the other party will lower their aspirations. Seeing a physical reaction is more believable than hearing someone saying, "I'm shocked".
- Good Guy/Bad Guy: Within the tactic of good guy/bad guy (synonyms are good cop/bad cop or black hat/white hat) positive and unpleasant tasks are divided between two negotiators on the same negotiation side or unpleasant tasks or decisions are allocated to a (real or fictitious) outsider. The "good guy" presents a considerate and understanding front, supports the conclusion of an agreement, and emphasizes positive aspects of the negotiation (mutual interests). The "bad guy" criticizes negative aspects (opposing interests). The division of the two roles allows for more consistent behavior and credibility on the part of each individual negotiator. As the "good guy" promotes the contract, he/she can build trust with the other side. The "good guy" can blame the "bad guy" for all the difficulties while soliciting concessions and agreement from the opponent.
- Highball/Low-ball or ambit claim: Depending on whether selling or buying, sellers or buyers use a ridiculously high, or ridiculously low opening offer that is not achievable. The theory is that the extreme offer makes the other party reevaluate their opening offer and move close to the resistance point (as far as you are willing to go to reach an agreement). Another advantage is that the party giving the extreme demand appears more flexible when they make concessions toward a more reasonable outcome. A danger of this tactic is that the opposite party may think negotiating is a waste of time.
- Mirroring: when people get on well, the outcome of a negotiation is likely to be more positive. To create trust and rapport, a negotiator may mimic or mirror the opponent's behavior and repeat what they say. Mirroring refers to a person repeating the core content of what another person just said, or repeating a certain expression. It indicates attention to the subject of negotiation and acknowledges the other party's point or statement. Mirroring can help create trust and establish a relationship.
- Old Mother Hubbard: as in the nursery rhyme, combining an apparent willingness to negotiate with an assertion that no additional offering or concession is available: "the cupboard is bare".
- The Nibble, also known as the salami tactic or quivering quill: nibbling is the demand for proportionally small concessions that have not been discussed previously just before closing the deal. This method takes advantage of the other party's desire to close by adding "just one more thing". Chester Karrass holds that the Nibble tactic and the Krunch tactic have similar features: the Krunch works by preventing a deal from being finalised by asking the opposing party to improve on their offer: "You've got to do better than that!".
- Publicity: use the prospects of negative publicity or likely disapproval to win an opposing party round.
- Russian front: a tactic ostensibly offering two options, of which one is so unacceptable (such as serving on the Russian Front in World War II) that the other alternative is seen as an attractive offer. Jon Lavelle suggests that the best response is to show that only one option is really being presented, and that "one option" is really "no option".
- Snow Job: Negotiators overwhelm the other party with so much information that they have difficulty determining what information is important, and what is a diversion. Negotiators may also use technical language or jargon to mask a simple answer to a question asked by a non-expert.
- Using a walk-away option: demonstrating that one party's walk-away is a viable option, or hinting at its prospective use; also, warning that pressure to walk-away will continue building up unless the opposing party improves its offer.

== Nonverbal communication ==
Communication is a key element of negotiation. Effective negotiation requires that participants effectively convey and interpret information. Participants in a negotiation communicate information not only verbally, but also non-verbally through their body language and gestures. By understanding how nonverbal communication works, a negotiator is better equipped to interpret the information other participants are leaking non-verbally while keeping secret those things that would inhibit his/her ability to negotiate. The use of nonverbal communication in negotiation has been compared to its use in dating.

=== Examples ===
==== Non-verbal "anchoring" ====
In a negotiation, a person can gain the advantage by verbally expressing a position first. By anchoring one's position, one establishes the position from which the negotiation proceeds. Similarly, one can "anchor" and gain an advantage with nonverbal (body language) cues.

- Personal space: The person at the head of the table is the apparent symbol of power. Negotiators can negate this strategic advantage by positioning allies in the room to surround that individual.
- First impression: Begin the negotiation with positive gestures and enthusiasm. Look the person in the eye with sincerity. If you cannot maintain eye contact, the other person might think you are hiding something or that you are insincere. Give a solid handshake.

==== Reading non-verbal communication ====
Being able to read the non-verbal communication of another person can significantly aid in the communication process. By being aware of inconsistencies between a person's verbal and non-verbal communication and reconciling them, negotiators can come to better resolutions. Examples of incongruity in body language include:

- Nervous laugh: A laugh not matching the situation. This could be a sign of nervousness or discomfort. When this happens, it may be good to probe with questions to discover the person's true feelings.
- Positive words but negative body language: If someone asks their negotiation partner if they are annoyed and the person pounds their fist and responds sharply, "what makes you think anything is bothering me?"
- Hands raised in a clenched position: The person raising his/her hands in this position reveals frustration even when he/she is smiling. This is a signal that the person doing it may be holding back a negative attitude.
- If possible, it may be helpful for negotiation partners to spend time together in a comfortable setting outside of the negotiation room. Knowing how each partner non-verbally communicates outside of the negotiation setting helps negotiation partners sense the incongruity between verbal and non-verbal communication.

==== Conveying receptivity ====
The way negotiation partners position their bodies relative to each other may influence how receptive each is to the other person's message and ideas.

- Face and eyes: receptive negotiators smile, and make plenty of eye contact. This conveys the idea that there is more interest in the person than in what is being said. On the other hand, non-receptive negotiators make little to no eye contact. Their eyes may be squinted, jaw muscles clenched and head turned slightly away from the speaker
- Arms and hands: to show receptivity, negotiators should spread their arms and open a hands-on table or relax on their lap. Negotiators show poor receptivity when their hands are clenched, crossed, positioned in front of their mouth, or rubbing the back of their neck.
- Legs and feet: receptive negotiators sit with legs together or one leg slightly in front of the other. When standing, they distribute weight evenly and place their hands on their hips with their body tilted toward the speaker. Non-receptive negotiators stand with their legs crossed, pointing away from the speaker.
- Torso: receptive negotiators sit on the edge of their chairs, unbuttoning their suit coats with their bodies tilted toward the speaker. Non-receptive negotiators may lean back in their chairs and keep their suit coats buttoned.

Receptive negotiators tend to appear relaxed with their hands open and palms visibly displayed.

=== Barriers ===
- Die-hard bargainers
- Lack of trust, or inability to allow time for trust to develop. Deepak Malhotra has observed that "trust may develop naturally over time, but negotiators rarely have the luxury of letting nature take its course".
- Informational vacuums and negotiator's dilemma
- Structural impediments
- Spoilers
- Cultural and gender differences
- Communication problems
- The power of dialogue.

== Emotion ==
Emotions play an important part in the negotiation process, although it is only in recent years that their effect is being studied. Emotions have the potential to play either a positive or negative role in negotiation. During negotiations, the decision as to whether or not to settle rests in part on emotional factors. Negative emotions can cause intense and even irrational behavior and can cause conflicts to escalate and negotiations to break down, but may be instrumental in attaining concessions. On the other hand, positive emotions often facilitate reaching an agreement and help to maximize joint gains, but can also be instrumental in attaining concessions. Positive and negative discrete emotions can be strategically displayed to influence task and relational outcomes and may play out differently across cultural boundaries.

=== Affect effect ===
Dispositions for effects affect various stages of negotiation: which strategies to use, which strategies are chosen, the way the other party and their intentions are perceived, their willingness to reach an agreement, and the final negotiated outcomes. Positive affectivity (PA) and negative affectivity (NA) of one or more of the negotiating sides can lead to very different outcomes.

=== Positive affect ===
Even before the negotiation process starts, people in a positive mood have more confidence, and higher tendencies to plan to use a cooperative strategy. During the negotiation, negotiators who are in a positive mood tend to enjoy the interaction more, show less contentious behavior, use less aggressive tactics, and more cooperative strategies. This, in turn, increases the likelihood that parties will reach their instrumental goals, and enhance the ability to find integrative gains. Indeed, compared with negotiators with negative or natural affectivity, negotiators with positive affectivity reached more agreements and tended to honor those agreements more. Those favorable outcomes are due to better decision-making processes, such as flexible thinking, creative problem-solving, respect for others' perspectives, willingness to take risks, and higher confidence. The post-negotiation positive effect has beneficial consequences as well. It increases satisfaction with the achieved outcome and influences one's desire for future interactions. The PA aroused by reaching an agreement facilitates the dyadic relationship, which brings commitment that sets the stage for subsequent interactions.
PA also has its drawbacks: it distorts the perception of self-performance, such that performance is judged to be relatively better than it is. Thus, studies involving self-reports on achieved outcomes might be biased.

=== Negative affect ===
Negative affect has detrimental effects on various stages in the negotiation process. Although various negative emotions affect negotiation outcomes, by far the most researched is anger. Angry negotiators plan to use more competitive strategies and cooperate less, even before the negotiation starts. These competitive strategies are related to reduced joint outcomes.

During negotiations, anger disrupts the process by reducing levels of trust, clouding parties' judgment, narrowing parties' focus of attention, and changing their central goal from reaching an agreement to retaliating against the other side. Angry negotiators pay less attention to their opponent's interests and are less accurate in judging their interests, thus achieving lower joint gains. Moreover, because anger makes negotiators more self-centered in their preferences, it increases the likelihood that they will reject profitable offers. Opponents who get angry (or cry, or otherwise lose control) are more likely to make errors. Anger does not help achieve negotiation goals either: it reduces joint gains and does not boost personal gains, as angry negotiators do not succeed. Moreover, negative emotions lead to acceptance of settlements that are not in a positive utility function but rather have a negative utility. However, the expression of negative emotions during negotiation can sometimes be beneficial: legitimately expressed anger can be an effective way to show one's commitment, sincerity, and needs. Moreover, although NA reduces gains in integrative tasks, it is a better strategy than PA in distributive tasks (such as zero-sum). In his work on negative affect arousal and white noise, Seidner found support for the existence of a negative affect arousal mechanism through observations regarding the devaluation of speakers from other ethnic origins. Negotiation may be negatively affected, in turn, by submerged hostility toward an ethnic or gender group.

Research undertaken by Nicholas Anderson and Margaret Neale of Stanford University, reported in 2010, looked at anger provoked in one member of a pair of negotiators. Half of the angry negotiators were sure that their counterparts had attempted to provoke their anger, while the other half were unsure. The outcome was that the uncertain negotiators were more successful in reaching agreements beneficial to both parties.

=== Conditions for emotion affect ===
Research indicates that a negotiator's emotions do not necessarily affect the negotiation process. Albarracın et al. (2003) suggested that there are two conditions for emotional affect, both related to the ability (presence of environmental or cognitive disturbances) and the motivation:

1. Identification of the effect: requires high motivation, high ability, or both.
2. The determination that the effect is relevant and important for the judgment: requires that either the motivation, the ability, or both are low.

According to this model, emotions affect negotiations only when one is high and the other is low. When both ability and motivation are low, the effect is identified, and when both are high the effect is identified but discounted as irrelevant to judgment. A possible implication of this model is, for example, that the positive effects of PA have on negotiations (as described above) are seen only when either motivation or ability is low.

=== Effect of partner's emotions ===
Most studies on emotion in negotiations focus on the effect of the negotiator's own emotions on the process. However, what the other party feels might be just as important, as group emotions are known to affect processes both at the group and the personal levels. When it comes to negotiations, trust in the other party is a necessary condition for its emotion to effect, and visibility enhances the effect. Emotions contribute to negotiation processes by signaling what one feels and thinks and can thus prevent the other party from engaging in destructive behaviors and indicate what steps should be taken next: PA signals to keep in the same way, while NA points out that mental or behavioral adjustments are needed.
Partner's emotions can have two basic effects on the negotiator's emotions and behavior: mimetic/ reciprocal or complementary. For example, disappointment or sadness might lead to compassion and more cooperation. In a study by Butt et al. (2005) that simulated real multi-phase negotiation, most people reacted to the partner's emotions in a reciprocal, rather than complementary, manner. Specific emotions were found to have different effects on the opponent's feelings and are strategies chosen:

- Anger caused the opponents to place lower demands and to concede more in a zero-sum negotiation, but also to evaluate the negotiation less favorably. It provoked both dominating and yielding behaviors of the opponent.
- Pride led to more integrative and compromise strategies by the partner.
- Guilt or regret expressed by the negotiator led to a better impression of him by the opponent, however, it also led the opponent to place higher demands. On the other hand, personal guilt was related to more satisfaction with what one achieved.
- Worry or disappointment left a bad impression on the opponent but led to relatively lower demands by the opponent.

=== Dealing with emotions ===
- Make emotions explicit and validate – Taking a more proactive approach in discussing one's emotions can allow for a negotiation to focus on the problem itself, rather than any unexpressed feelings. It is important to allow both parties to share their emotions.
- Allow time to let off steam – It is possible that one party may feel angry or frustrated at some point during the negotiation. Rather than try to avoid discussing those feelings, allow the individual to talk it out. Sitting and listening, without providing too much feedback on the substance itself, can offer enough support for the person to feel better. Once the grievances are released, it may become easier to negotiate.
- Symbolic gestures – Consider that an apology, or any other simple act, may be one of the most effective and low-cost means to reduce any negative emotions between parties.
- Empathy – In every negotiation, emotions will play a major role in determining what is said. It is possible to overreact and misinterpret what the other party says by projecting assumptions. To avoid miscommunication and build a collaborative environment, it is important to shift the focus to the other party and be fully present with them, listening without judgment instead of acting in self-interest and focusing on one's own needs and fears. To increase one's chances of reaching a deal that works for both parties, one needs to be focused on the other party, their emotions, their interests, and their worries in order to give them what they want. When the other party feels heard and acknowledged, barriers to communication fall, and reaching a consensus is much more likely to happen.

=== Problems with laboratory studies ===
Negotiation is a complex interaction. Capturing all its complexity is a very difficult task, let alone isolating and controlling only certain aspects of it. For this reason, most negotiation studies are done under laboratory conditions and focus only on some aspects. Although such studies have their advantages, they do have major drawbacks when studying emotions:

- Emotions in laboratory studies are usually manipulated and are therefore relatively 'cold' (not intense). Although those 'cold' emotions might be enough to show effects, they are qualitatively different from the 'hot' emotions often experienced during negotiations.
- In real life, people select which negotiations to enter, which affects emotional commitment, motivation, and interests, but this is not the case in lab studies.
- Laboratory studies tend to focus on relatively few well-defined emotions. Real-life scenarios provoke a much wider scale of emotions.
- Coding the emotions has a double catch: if done by a third side, some emotions might not be detected as the negotiator sublimates them for strategic reasons. Self-report measures might overcome this, but they are usually filled only before or after the process, and if filled during the process might interfere with it.

== Group composition ==
=== Multi-party ===
While negotiations involving more than two parties are less often researched, some results from two-party negotiations still apply to more than two parties. One such result is that in negotiations it is common to see language similarity arise between the two negotiating parties. In three-party negotiations, language similarity still arose, and results were particularly efficient when the party with the most to gain from the negotiation adopted language similarities from the other parties.

=== Teams ===
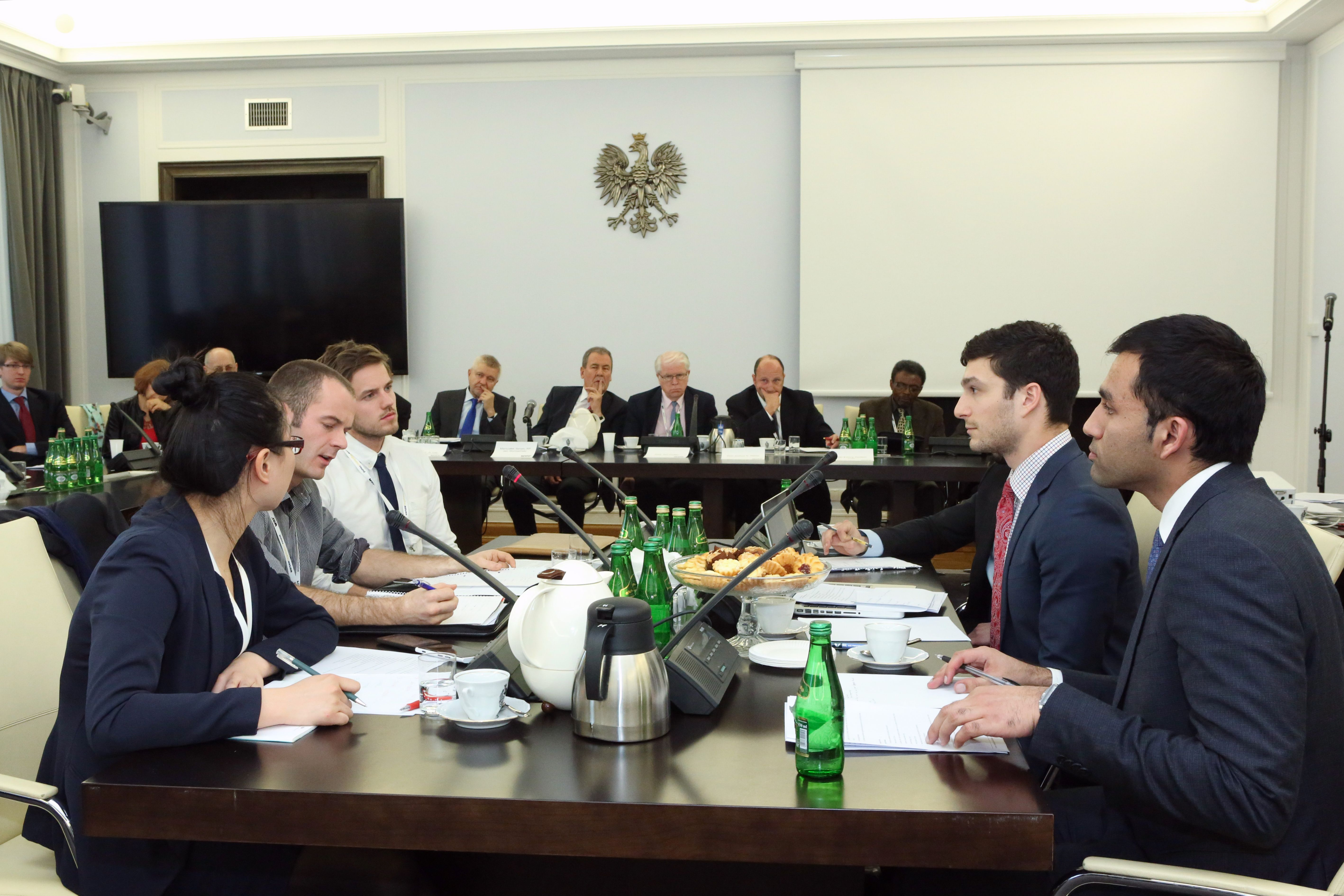
Students from the University of Tromsø and the University of Toronto during the 5th International Negotiation Tournament – Warsaw Negotiation Round in the Polish Senate (2014)

Due to globalization and growing business trends, negotiation in the form of teams has become widely adopted. Elizabeth A. Mannix refers to "strength in numbers" when forming a negotiating team, but warns about the danger of failing to prepare which reliance on others can also generate.

Teams can effectively collaborate to break down a complex negotiation. There is more knowledge and wisdom dispersed in a team than in a single mind. Writing, listening, and talking, are specific roles team members must satisfy. The capacity base of a team reduces the number of blunders and increases familiarity in a negotiation.

However, unless a team can appropriately utilize the full capacity of its potential, effectiveness can suffer. One factor in the effectiveness of team negotiation is a problem that occurs through solidarity behavior. Solidarity behavior occurs when one team member reduces his or her utility (benefit) to increase the benefits of other team members. This behavior is likely to occur when interest conflicts rise. When the utility/needs of the negotiation opponent do not align with every team member's interests, team members begin to make concessions and balance the benefits gained among the team.

Intuitively, this may feel like a cooperative approach. However, though a team may aim to negotiate in a cooperative or collaborative nature, the outcome may be less successful than is possible, especially when integration is possible. The integrative potential is possible when different negotiation issues are of different importance to each team member. The integrative potential is often missed due to the lack of awareness of each member's interests and preferences. Ultimately, this leads to a poorer negotiation result.

Thus, a team can perform more effectively if each member discloses his or her preferences before the negotiation. This step will allow the team to recognize and organize the team's joint priorities, which they can take into consideration when engaging with the opposing negotiation party. Because a team is more likely to discuss shared information and common interests, teams must make an active effort to foster and incorporate unique viewpoints from experts from different fields. Research by Daniel Thiemann, which largely focused on computer-supported collaborative tasks, found that the Preference Awareness method is an effective tool for fostering knowledge about joint priorities and further helps the team judge which negotiation issues were of the highest importance.

=== Women ===
Women often excel in collaborative and integrative negotiations, where they can leverage their strong communication skills and empathy to find mutually beneficial solutions. However, they may face challenges in competitive or distributive negotiations, where a more assertive and confrontational approach is typically required. Many of the implications of these findings have strong financial impacts in addition to the social backlash faced by self-advocating women in negotiations, as compared to other advocating women, self-advocating men, and other advocating men. Research in this area has been studied across platforms, in addition to more specific areas like women as physician assistants. The backlash associated with this type of behavior is attributed to the fact that to be self-advocated is considered masculine, whereas the alternative, being accommodating, is considered more feminine. Males, however, do not appear to face any type of backlash for not being self-advocating.

This research has been supported by multiple studies, including one which evaluated candidates participating in a negotiation regarding compensation. This study showed that women who initiated negotiations were evaluated more poorly than men who initiated negotiations. In another variation of this particular setup, men and women evaluated videos of men and women either accepting a compensation package or initiating negotiations. Men evaluated women more poorly for initiating negotiations, while women evaluated both men and women more poorly for initiating negotiations. In this particular experiment, women were less likely to initiate a negotiation with a male, citing nervousness, but there was no variation with the negotiation initiated with another female.

Research also supports the notion that the way individuals respond in a negotiation varies depending on the gender of the opposite party. In all-male groups, the use of deception showed no variation in the level of trust between negotiating parties, however in mixed-sex groups, there was an increase in deceptive tactics when it was perceived that the opposite party was using an accommodating strategy. In all-female groups, there were many shifts in when individuals did and did not employ deception in their negotiation tactics.

=== Academic negotiation ===
The academic world contains a unique management system, wherein faculty members, some of whom have tenure, reside in academic units (e.g. departments), and are overseen by chairs, or heads. These chairs/heads are in turn supervised by deans of the college where their academic unit resides. Negotiation is an area where faculties, chairs/heads, and their deans have little preparation; their doctoral degrees are typically in a highly specialized area according to their academic expertise. However, the academic environment frequently presents situations where negotiation takes place. For example, many faculties are hired with the expectation that they will conduct research and publish scholarly works. For these faculties, where their research requires equipment, space, and/or funding, negotiation of a "start-up" package is critical for their success and future promotion. Also, department chairs often find themselves in situations, typically involving resource redistribution where they must negotiate with their dean, on behalf of their unit. And deans oversee colleges where they must optimize limited resources, such as research space or operating funds while at the same time creating an environment that fosters student success, research accomplishments, and more.

Integrative negotiation is the type predominately found in academic negotiation, where trust and long-term relationships between personnel are valued. Techniques found to be particularly useful in academic settings include:

- doing your homework – grounding your request in facts
- knowing your value
- listening actively and acknowledging what is being said
- putting yourself in their shoes
- asking – negotiation begins with an ask
- not committing immediately
- managing emotion
- keeping in mind the principle of a "wise agreement", with its associated emphasis on meeting the interests of both parties to the extent possible as a key working point.

== See also ==
- Alternating offers protocol
- Appeasement
- Asymmetric negotiation
- Collaborative software
- Collective action
- Conciliation
- Contract
- Cross-cultural
- Cross-cultural differences in decision-making
- Delaying tactic
- Deterrence
- Diplomacy
- Dispute resolution
- Expert determination
- Flipism
- Game theory
- Impasse
- International relations
- Leadership
- Multilateralism
- Nash equilibrium
- Principled negotiation
- Prisoner's dilemma
- Program on Negotiation
- Trust metric
