= Quasi-alliance =

A quasi-alliance is a relationship between two states that have not formed an alliance despite sharing a common ally. It is an informal security arrangement that is not based on a formal collective defence pact, but it is instead based on tacit agreements. It is unique from an alliance as the states do not have this formal collective defence pact. These two states may remain unallied due to alliance hindrances such as historical animosity, but still share a common, powerful ally capable of diminishing the two states' security fears; security fears caused by a common threat.

== Characteristics ==
=== Structure ===
A quasi-alliance can exist as either bilateral or multilateral. This means two nations cooperating or as multiple states jointly cooperating, respectively. The political actors involved constitute both sovereign and non-sovereign actors. This means that a non-sovereign nation may partake because there is no formal alliance. The alliance is a form of military and security cooperation that always targets a third-party. The targeting of a third-party can either be explicit or implicit.

=== Practicalities ===
A quasi-alliance is formed through a tacit agreement as opposed to being established by a formal agreement. Therefore, they are not formalised as the alliance is instead implied. Therefore, the alliance itself may also be tacit, though it is also possible for them to exist in ad hoc. Because the management of the alliance cannot rely on formalised agreements, those involved must rely on mutual expectations. Mutual expectations may be based on communiqués, joint declarations, memoranda, treaties of friendship, declarations on the press conference, domestic laws or United Nations resolutions.

== Theoretical model ==
The Quasi-Alliance Model, developed by Victor Cha from a Neoclassical realism approach, aims to explain why states form quasi-alliances based on concerns of abandonment and entrapment. The concepts of abandonment and entrapment were introduced by Glenn Snyder. Abandonment refers to the fear of an ally leaving, or failing to live up to the expectations of the alliance; entrapment refers to the alliance becoming detrimental to the state's own interests. Entrapment can be an occurrence of chain ganging.

The model proposes three behavioural patterns of states within an alliance regarding abandonment and entrapment:

- A state fearing abandonment will show a stronger commitment to the alliance, hoping for the ally to reciprocate this commitment.
- A state fearing entrapment will show a weaker commitment to the alliance, hoping for the ally to be more compromising towards adversity.
- States aim to maximise the attainable security from the alliance, while minimising their obligations to the alliance.

Based on these propositions, the theoretical model explains why states in a quasi-alliance benefit from the presence of the third-party state. Bilateral alliances are the inner core of the quasi-alliance, and the multilateral alliance with respect to the third-party ally is the outer core. If the inner core represents an asymmetrical concern of abandonment and entrapment between the bilateral alliance, there will not be cooperation. The presence of a third-party state in the outer core can resolve the asymmetrical concern by reducing the fears of abandonment and offering security. Yet, the bilateral states may strengthen their alliance further and increase cooperation out of the new fear of abandonment from their third-party state. Regardless of the asymmetrical and symmetrical nature of the quasi-alliance, the actions of the third-party is the most important factor to cooperative relations; this overrides the importance of changes in the international security environment, domestic attitudes and the status of the bilateral relations.

=== Conflicting theories ===
The balance of threat model is the main opposing theory to the quasi-alliance model. The balance of threat model explains alliance formation as a result of threats, that there is a correlation between higher levels of threat and higher levels of alliance formation. The quasi-alliance model critiques this for excluding the commitment of the third-party ally. Alliance formation is instead more probable when there is not a commitment of a third-party ally, and the existence of a threat does not have the relevance claimed by the balance of threat model. When there is not a strong commitment of a third-party ally: alliances will form. If there is a strong commitment of a third-party ally, there is a greater incentive for states to ally because there is not a guarantor of security.

== Examples ==
=== Japan-Korea ===
Japan-Korea relations may be referred to as a quasi-alliance, as the two states remain unallied, but share a common threat, North Korea, and a common ally, the United States. The two states remain unallied mainly due to historical animosity rooting from the period of Japanese colonialism. The states began normalising their diplomatic relations in 1965 after the Treaty on Basic Relations.

=== Australia-Japan ===
Australia-Japan relations prior to September 18th 2015 were referred to as a relationship of "non-traditional security" based on disaster relief efforts and international peacekeeping operations. After September 18th 2015 and the election of Tony Abbott as Australian prime minister, the "Special strategic partnership" was announced. This represented greater cooperation between Australia and Japan in defence technology, maritime security, peace and new areas of future cooperation. It is a quasi-alliance because the United States is there common ally, while Australia and Japan act as partners in the trilateral cooperation. They also cooperate on the joint fear of China disrupting the status quo of maritime affairs.

=== Greece-Israel-Cyprus ===
Greece-Israel-Cyprus relations can be classified as a quasi-alliance because they have not signed a formal military treaty although they maintain a strong relationship with a security aspect as well. Their relations are defined by the Energy Triangle and the possible vulnerabilities from energy insecurities. The quasi-alliance is driven by their individual and collective motivations. Regarding the collective motivations, Greece and Israel maintain an quasi-alliance with Cyprus in part because of their common perception of Turkey as a threat. These perceptions stem -as per the balance of threat theory- from geographical proximity, offensive capabilities and perceived intentions. The deterioration of Israel-Turkey relations and the discovery of hydrocarbons triggered the establishment of a quasi-alliance for a joint security from Turkey in the early 2010s.
