= Bad faith =

Duplicity, fraud, or deception

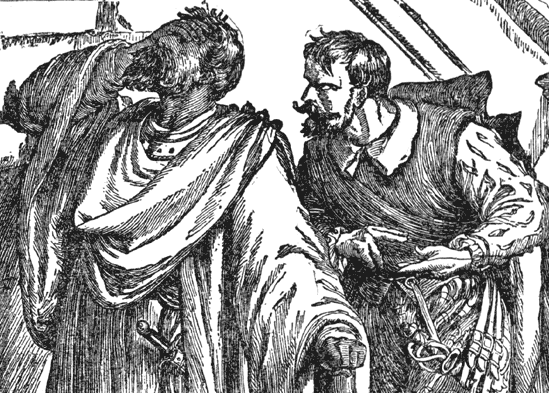
Othello (left) and Iago (right) from Othello by William Shakespeare. Much of the tragedy of the play is brought about by advice Iago gives to Othello in bad faith.

Bad faith (Latin: mala fidēs) is a sustained form of deception which consists of entertaining or pretending to entertain one set of feelings while acting as if influenced by another. It is associated with hypocrisy, breach of contract, affectation, and lip service. It may involve intentional deceit of others, or self-deception.

Some examples of bad faith include: soldiers waving a white flag and then firing when their enemy approaches to take prisoners (cf. perfidy); a company representative who negotiates with union workers while having no intent of compromising; a prosecutor who argues a legal position that he knows to be false; and an insurer who uses language and reasoning which are deliberately misleading in order to deny a claim. Generally considered an ethically reprehensible practice, dealing in bad faith may be viewed more positively from a consequentialist perspective, for example, in the problem of dirty hands. It may be viewed as a method of survival or pragmatic management of a hostile environment.

In philosophy, after Jean-Paul Sartre's analysis of the concepts of self-deception and bad faith, the latter concept has been examined in specialized fields as it pertains to self-deception as two semi-independently acting minds within one mind, with one deceiving the other. Bad faith may be viewed in some cases to not involve deception, as in some kinds of hypochondria with actual physical manifestations. There is a question about the truth or falsity of statements made in bad faith self-deception; for example, the veracity of a hypochondriac making a complaint about their psychosomatic condition.

Bad faith has been used as a term of art in diverse areas involving feminism, racial supremacism, political negotiation, insurance claims processing, intentionality, ethics, existentialism, climate change denial, and the law.

== Definition ==
In the book Being and Nothingness (1943), the philosopher Jean-Paul Sartre defined bad faith (Fr. mauvaise foi) as the action of a person hiding the truth from him- or herself. That "the one to whom the lie is told and the one who lies are one and the same person, which means that I must know the truth, in my capacity as [the] deceiver, though [the truth] is hidden from me in my capacity as the one deceived"; thus, in the praxis of bad faith, "I must know that truth very precisely, in order to hide it from myself the more carefully – and this not at two different moments of temporality."

A person choosing self-deception is the fundamental question about bad faith: "What makes self-deception possible?" For a liar to successfully deceive the victim, the liar must know that the lie is a falsehood. In order to be successfully deceived, the victim must believe the lie to be true. When a person acts in bad faith, that person is both the liar and the victim of the lie. The contradiction is that a person in bad-faith self-deception believes something to be true and false at the same time.

== In philosophy, psychology, and psychoanalysis ==
=== Freudian psychoanalysis ===
Freudian psychoanalysis answers how bad faith self-deception is made possible by postulating an unconscious dimension of our being that is amoral, whereas the conscious is in fact regulated by morality, law, and custom, accomplished by what Freud calls repression. The true desires of the unconscious express themselves as wish fulfillment in dreams, or as an ethical position unconsciously taken to satisfy the wishes of the unconscious mind.

=== Ethics, phenomenology, existentialism ===
Bad faith wish fulfillment is central to the ethics of belief, which discusses questions at the intersection of epistemology, philosophy of mind, psychology, Freudian psychoanalysis, and ethics.

A person who is not lying to themself is authentic. "Authenticity" is being faithful to internal rather than external ideas.

Bad faith in ethics may be when an unethical position is taken as ethical, and justified by appeal to being forced to that belief as an excuse, e.g., by God or by that person's natural disposition due to genetics, even though facts disconfirm that belief and honesty would require it.

Phenomenology plays a role leading to discussions of bad faith. It has a role in ethics by an analysis of the structure of will, valuing, happiness, and care for others (in empathy and sympathy). Phenomenologist Heidegger discussed care, conscience, and guilt, moving to "authenticity", which in turn led to the feminism of Simone de Beauvoir and the existentialism of Jean-Paul Sartre, both based on phenomenology's considerations of authenticity and its role in bad faith. Sartre analyzed the logical problem of "bad faith" as it relates to authenticity, and developed an ontology of value as produced by willing in good faith.

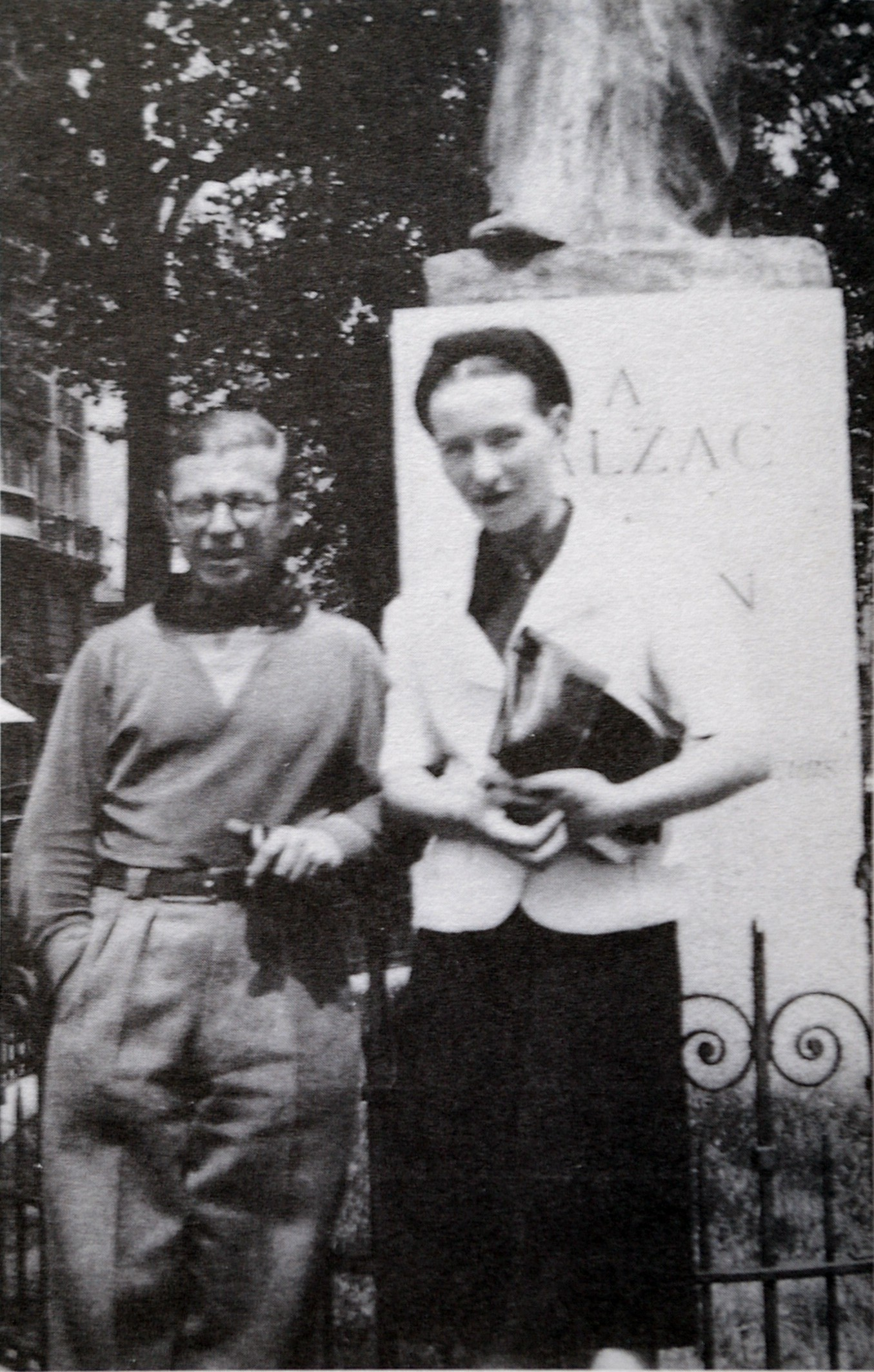
Jean-Paul Sartre and Simone de Beauvoir developed ideas about bad faith into existentialism.

Jean-Paul Sartre and Simone de Beauvoir developed ideas about bad faith into existentialism, using the concepts of bad faith and "authenticity" in the ethics of belief. In Being and Nothingness, Sartre begins his discussion of bad faith by raising the question of how bad faith self-delusion is possible. Sartre calls "bad faith" a kind of project of self-deception. In order to produce excuses, bad faith first takes a third-person stance toward itself. When it becomes necessary to elude this stance it has made of itself, it then adopts the first-person perspective. In neither case can the deception fully succeed. Without these two facets of existence, if consciousness was unitary and not divisible, as in the indivisible "I" in "I think, therefore I am", it would be impossible to explain how the very project of self-deception could be possible. The Freudian theory of the unconscious is viewed by Sartre as based on an incoherent view of consciousness, but the project of psychoanalysis as an uncovering of the "fundamental project" of an individual's life is considered to be valid.

Jean-Paul Sartre called the belief that there is something intrinsically good in itself, which is inherent in the world as absolute value and is discoverable by people, the "spirit of seriousness", which he argued leads to bad faith. He argued that people fall into the spirit of seriousness because they take their values too seriously, and forget that values are contingent, chosen and assigned subjectively. In Sartre's words, "the spirit of seriousness has two characteristics: it considers values as transcendent givens, independent of human subjectivity, and it transfers the quality of 'desirable' from the ontological structure of things to their simple material constitution."

=== Psychology ===
Psychologists have proposed answers as to how bad faith self-delusion can be possible.

A "tropism" is an action done without conscious thought. While self-deception may be a tropism, not consciously done, it may be guided by "projects" one may set for one's life, such as a desire to get into heaven, or for personal pleasure, wealth, or power. For example, a creationist has a project to get into heaven, and a racist with feelings of personal inadequacy may have a project to be superior or to have power over some others. The project may create self-deception without conscious thought, as a tropism creates action without conscious thought. A project may be selfish, and overwhelm reason from facts, though its consequences are not directly intentional. But the project itself may be intentionally sought, and in a selfish way, whence bad faith arises, as a result of selfish or bad intention in choice of project.

A homunculus is a little person (or map of the person) inside a person, and homuncularism is the theory in psychology that there are subsystems of the mind performing different operations; the homuncularist answer to the question as to how bad faith is possible is that one such subunit deceives the other.

In humanistic psychology, recognition of bad faith in one's own acts by the actor results in guilt and regret.

Psychologists have examined the role of bad faith in psychologists overseeing and directing torture, when they know that it is wrong, e.g., in the Guantanamo detention center.

=== Truth values ===
There is controversy as to whether propositions made in bad faith are true or false, such as when a hypochondriac has a complaint with no physical symptom.

=== In pseudosciences ===
Bad faith can exist not only in an individual, but in entire systems of knowledge.

Within the pseudoscience of racial eugenics, bad faith is proposed to be a motivator for self-defensive action against an objectified race of people to justifiably uphold a desire for racial supremacy; e.g., a minority group of whites who believe that blacks are inferior in bad faith to motivate the preservation of their white-race differences, while their faith is motivated in fear of elimination from within a volatile racial environment. Bad faith racial supremacist's beliefs are studied in African American studies. In Nazi Germany, companies knowingly competed for the manufacture of efficient ovens for the concentration camps to make money with the manufacturers justified in their actions by self-deception, but intentionally so as to be in bad faith. A person can intentionally self-deceive by being inauthentic or insincere, as the Nazis organization did in holding their beliefs to justify their eugenics and genocide.

=== Religion ===
Jean-Paul Sartre described one kind of bad faith as claiming a direction from a non-existent deity or using religious authority to take unethical positions or espouse untrue beliefs.

The Catholic Church does not consider everyone with heretical views to have bad faith: for example, people who earnestly seek the truth and lead exemplary lives.

Persons practicing Zen claim not to be subject to the "bad faith" in "self-deception", since they do not explain a motivation for action, as a rationalist would. A rationalist must rationalize an irrational desire that is actually rooted in the body and the unconscious as if it were not.

=== Analytical philosophy and the error theory of moral statements ===
For philosophers in the Anglo-American analytical tradition, statements involving moral values have caused concern because of their similarity to statements about objects and events in the physical world. Compare:

- Littering is commonplace in Chiang Mai
- Littering is wrong

Both have the same grammatical structure, but the way we might verify the first is quite different from the way we might want to verify the second. We can verify the first statement by observations made in the physical world, but according to David Hume, no amount of physical world observation can verify statements of the second type. Hume's view is summarized as "you can not derive 'ought' from 'is'". Whereas statements of the first type must be true or false, some philosophers have argued that moral statements are neither true nor false. Richard M. Hare, for example, argues that moral statements are in fact imperatives (commands). For him, the statement "littering is wrong" means "do not litter", and "do not litter" is neither true nor false.

In sharp contrast to people like Hare, J.L. Mackie contended that moral statements are false. Mackie's view discomforts Crispin Wright who says that it "relegates moral discourse to bad faith". Wright is not saying that all moral statements are bad faith. What he is saying is that if Mackie is correct, and somebody believes that Mackie is correct, then that person will be guilty of bad faith whenever he makes a moral statement.

== In law ==
In law, there are inconsistent definitions of bad faith, with one definition much more broad than used in other fields of study discussed in the above sections. Black's Law Dictionary equates fraud with bad faith. But one goes to jail for fraud, and not necessarily for bad faith. The Duhaime online law dictionary similarly defines bad faith broadly as "intent to deceive", and "a person who intentionally tries to deceive or mislead another in order to gain some advantage". A Canadian labor arbitrator wrote, in one case, that bad faith is related to rationality in reasoning, as it is used in other fields, but is ill-defined in the law.

The concept of bad faith is likely not capable of precise calibration and certainly has not been defined in the same way by all adjudicators. At its core, bad faith implies malice or ill will. A decision made in bad faith is grounded, not on a rational connection between the circumstances and the outcome, but on antipathy toward the individual for non-rational reasons...The absence of a rational basis for the decision implies that factors other than those relevant were considered. In that sense, a decision in bad faith is also arbitrary. These comments are not intended to put to rest the debate over the definition of bad faith. Rather, it is to point out that bad faith, which has its core in malice and ill will, at least touches, if not wholly embraces, the related concepts of unreasonableness, discrimination and arbitrariness.

What was called "Canada's best judicial definition of 'bad faith'" by Duhaime's Legal Dictionary is similarly more consistent with use in other fields discussed above.

Good faith and its opposite, bad faith, imports a subjective state of mind, the former motivated by honesty of purpose and the latter by ill-will.

Duhaime also refers to another description, "... bad faith refers to a subjective state of mind ... motivated by ill will ... or even sinister purposes."

The current standard legal definition of "bad faith" in the law of England and Wales is that of Lindsay J in Gromax Plasticulture Ltd. v. Don and Low Nonwovens Ltd:

Plainly it includes dishonesty and, as I would hold, includes also some dealings which fall short of the standards of acceptable commercial behaviour observed by reasonable and experienced men in the particular area being examined. Parliament has wisely not attempted to explain in detail what is or is not bad faith in this context; how far a dealing must so fall-short in order to amount to bad faith is a matter best left to be adjudged not by some paraphrase by the Courts (which leads to the danger of the Courts then construing not the Act but the paraphrase) but by reference to the words of the Act and upon a regard to all material surrounding circumstances.

=== Insurance bad faith ===
Insurance bad faith is a tort claim that an insured may have against an insurer for its bad acts, e.g. intentionally denying a claim by giving spurious citations of exemptions in the policy to mislead an insured, adjusting the claim in a dishonest manner, failing to quickly process a claim, or other intentional misconduct in claims processing. Insurance bad faith has been broadened beyond use in other fields to include total inaction, a refusal to respond to a claim in any way.

Courts can award punitive or exemplary damages, over and above actual damages against any insurance company which is found to have adjusted a claim in bad faith. Such damages may be awarded with the aim of deterring such behavior among insurers in general, and may far exceed the amount of the damage due under the insurance policy. In Canada, one case of this type resulted in a record punitive award of CAD $1 million when an insurance company pressed a claim for arson even after its own experts and adjusters had come to the conclusion that the fire was accidental. The company had been advised by legal counsel that the desperate insured parties would be willing to settle for much less than what they were owed.

== In social sciences ==
=== Feminism ===
Central to feminism is the idea that women are systematically subordinated, and bad faith exists when women surrender their agency to this subordination, e.g., acceptance of religious beliefs that a man is the dominant party in a marriage by the will of God; Simone de Beauvoir labels such women "mutilated" and "immanent". Simone de Beauvoir developed modern conceptions of bad faith and modern feminism together in her book The Second Sex.

=== Theory of justice ===
Bad faith is important to the concept of original position in John Rawls' theory of justice, where mutual commitment of the parties requires that the parties cannot choose and agree to principles in bad faith. They have to be able, not just to live with and grudgingly accept, but to sincerely endorse the principles of justice. A party cannot take risks with principles he knows he will have difficulty voluntarily complying with, or they would be making an agreement in bad faith – which is ruled out by the conditions of the original position.

=== Negotiation theory ===
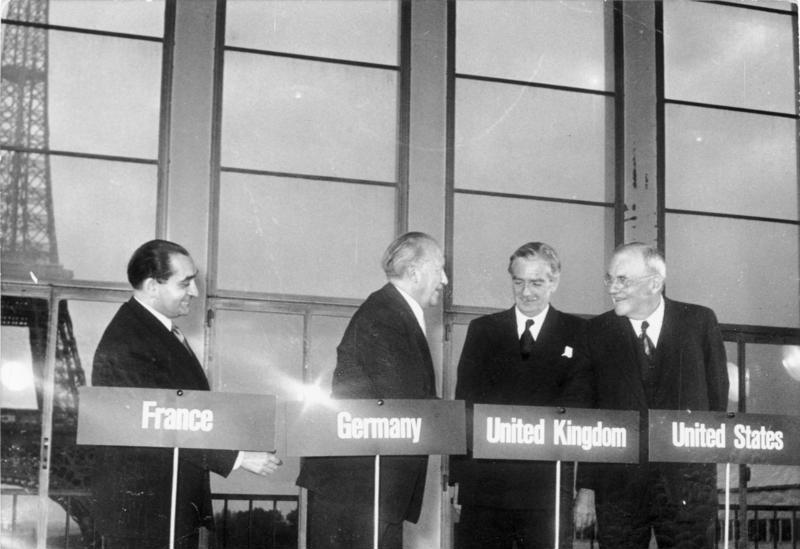
U.S. Secretary of State John Foster Dulles used an "inherent bad faith" model when negotiating with the Soviet Union in International relations.

Bad faith is a concept in negotiation theory whereby parties pretend to reason to reach settlement, but have no intention to do so. For example, one political party may pretend to negotiate, with no intention to compromise, for political effect; for instance, extracting concessions in negotiating over legislation in order to weaken it, while intending from the beginning to vote against the compromise.

Bad faith in political science and political psychology refers to negotiating strategies in which there is no real intention to reach compromise, or a model of information processing. The "inherent bad faith model" of information processing is a theory in political psychology that was first put forth by Ole Holsti to explain the relationship between U.S. Secretary of State John Foster Dulles' beliefs and his model of information processing.

=== Loyalty and patriotism ===
Bad faith is associated with being double minded, or of divided loyalty. (See theology section above.)

The philosophy of loyalty examines unchosen loyalties, e.g., one does not choose one's family or country, but when there is excessive wrongdoing, there is a general unwillingness to question these unchosen loyalties, and this exhibits bad faith as a type of lack of integrity. Once we have such loyalties, we are resistant to their scrutiny and self-defensively discount challenges to them in bad faith.

In the philosophy of patriotism (loyalty to one's country) bad faith is hiding from oneself the true source of some of one's patriotic beliefs, such as when one fights for a racist totalitarian dictatorship against a free and egalitarian democracy.

== See also ==
- Cognitive dissonance
- Concern troll
- Guilty conscience
- Mental reservation
