= Bilateralism =

Relationship between two sovereign states

Bilateralism is the conduct of political, economic, or cultural relations between two sovereign states. It is in contrast to unilateralism or multilateralism, which is activity by a single state or jointly by multiple states, respectively. When states recognize one another as sovereign states and agree to diplomatic relations, they create a bilateral relationship. States with bilateral ties will exchange diplomatic agents such as ambassadors to facilitate dialogues and cooperations.

Economic agreements, such as free trade agreements (FTAs) or foreign direct investment (FDI), signed by two states, are a common example of bilateralism. Since most economic agreements are signed according to the specific characteristics of the contracting countries to give preferential treatment to each other, not a generalized principle but a situational differentiation is needed. Thus through bilateralism, states can obtain more tailored agreements and obligations that only apply to particular contracting states. However, the states will face a trade-off because it is more wasteful in transaction costs than the multilateral strategy. In a bilateral strategy, a new contract has to be negotiated for each participant. So it tends to be preferred when transaction costs are low and the member surplus, which corresponds to "producer surplus" in economic terms, is high. Moreover, this will be effective if an influential state wants control over small states from a liberalism perspective, because building a series of bilateral arrangements with small states can increase a state's influence.

== Examples ==
- Australia and Canada have a bilateral relationship; both have similar governments and share similar values as well as having the same titular head of state. In 1895 the Government of Canada sent John Larke to Sydney to establish a trade commission and in 1935 Canada sent Charles Burchell (Australia's first Canadian High Commissioner) to formalise ties between the two countries. Both nations have been wartime allies, and their trade and economic relations are strong.
- India and Nepal have had a bilateral relationship since ancient times even before the birth of the Buddha in 563 BC. In modern times, this traditional relationship has been confirmed by written treaties. The India-Nepal treaty of friendship was signed in July 1950. That provided economically and politically important effects for both countries. In 2011, the two countries signed a new Bilateral Investment Promotion and Protection Agreement. These bilateral treaties have played a significant role in the evolution of international investment law. Citizens of both countries can move across the border freely without passport or visa, live and work in either country and own property and business in either country. Gurkhas form a part of the Indian Army. Millions of Nepalis have been living in India for long periods of time.
- The United States has bilateral relationships with several East Asian countries, particularly South Korea, Japan, and Taiwan. The United States formed a bilateral alliance with Japan during the Security Treaty between the United States and Japan. The U.S. also formed a bilateral alliance with Korea during the 1953 U.S.–South Korea Status of Forces Agreement and one with the Republic of China during the 1954 Sino-American Mutual Defense Treaty. Unlike its relationship with European nations which takes multilateral alliances centered in NATO, the U.S. prefers a direct relationship with each of the East Asian countries. Rather than establishing a security alliance or hosting a summit, the U.S. tends to make a direct connection with each nation. From both historical and political perspectives, every country in the East Asian region can be an opponent or a target to any other. Therefore, it is comparatively difficult to construct multilateral alliances, which depend upon mutual reliance. A main U.S. reason for choosing a bilateral treaty was to avoid conflict, as might have been the case with multilateral treaties (e.g. risk of multilateral treaty defects). An example is the "hub and spokes" reference, where the U.S. is the "hub" and the East Asian countries are the "spokes"; they each have a connection with the U.S. but not with each other.
  - There are multiple factors that are unique when discussing why the United States has chosen to form bilateral relations particularly with East Asian countries, in comparison to the multilateral relations, such as NATO. Firstly, the United States had existing and longer relations with countries in Europe. Thus it was easier for the United States to build and form this multilateral bond. Victor Cha states "Acheson argued that NATO was the product of a long, deliberative process, that West European powers had carefully developed their plan for collective defense before asking for U.S. help, and most revealing, that the United States viewed NATO as a mutual collective defense arrangement." Another factor which contributed is the geography of East Asia compared to Europe. Because Europe is "connected", it is better for the security and economy. Whereas in East Asia, states are divided over a large space and is separated by large amounts of water and distance, making it a less admirable condition to form multilateral bonds for the United States. In East Asia, there are also a variety of regimes: communist, authoritarian regimes as well as democratic regimes. In comparison to the states in NATO, who are consisted of democracies, causing a level of difficulty in creating multilateral relations. Another factor is that the states in NATO recognised the same source of threat, which was USSR. This allowed for an agreement amongst these NATO states to form this multilateral relation. However, in the case with East Asia, there was no unified threat. For the ROC (Republic of China, otherwise known as Taiwan), China was seen as the threat. For the ROK (Republic of Korea, otherwise known as South Korea), DPRK (Democratic People's Republic of Korea, otherwise known as North Korea) was the threat. Thus there was a great level of difficulty in the United States forming an alliance with East Asia as the threats were different. Among many of the different explanations behind the United States' choice of intervening in the bilateral alliances in East Asia, some social historians added that the U.S. decision makers firmly believed that unlike Europe, "inferior" Asians presumably did not possess the level of sophistication and responsibility that was required for the complex organization of the multilateral security arrangements. Christopher Hemmer and Peter J. Katzenstein concluded, "trust [was] absent, religion and domestic value were shared in only few cases, and race invoked as a powerful force separating the U.S. from Asia".
  - Victor Cha proposed the Powerplay theory in his article "Powerplay: Origins of the U.S. Alliance System in Asia", which explains the reasons behind the United States' decision in creating a series of bilateral alliances with East Asian countries. Powerplay is commonly used in any political or social situation when one uses its knowledge or information against others in order to gain benefits using situational advantages the one has. According to the powerplay theory, the alliances were created to both contain and constrain potential rogue allies (rogue state) from performing aggressive behavior that would trigger larger military conflict and involvement. The rogue allies (rogue states) include Taiwan's Kai Shek Chiang, who was publicly planning and looking forward to take back mainland China, and Korea's Syngman Rhee, who wanted to unify the Korean peninsula. The United States was also worried that Japan would recover its regional power in Asia. Cha concludes that the postwar United States planners had selected such a type of security architecture as an attempt to prevent aggression by the East Asian pro-west dictators and to increase leverage and states' dependency on the U.S. economy.
  - The U.S.–Japan alliance was a bilateral security order created with the intention of preventing the expansion of Soviet power and communism in the Asia Pacific. The U.S. provided Japan, and the other Asia Pacific countries, with the offer of security protection and access to American markets, technology, and supplies in exchange for providing diplomatic, economic, and logistical support for the U.S., as this, according to John Ikenberry, would lead to the "wider, American-centered anti-Communist postwar order".
- The United States also has a history of bilateral agreements with Panama, beginning with the Hay–Bunau-Varilla Treaty (1903) which established the United States' right to build a canal and own it and adjacent property across the otherwise-sovereign nation of Panama. This was replaced by the Treaty Concerning the Permanent Neutrality and Operation of the Panama Canal and the Panama Canal Treaty (both signed 1977). A bilateral investment treaty amendment was signed by the two countries in 2000, and several more limited agreements have been signed between various law-enforcement and financial agencies of the two countries.

== History ==
There has been a long debate on the merits of bilateralism versus multilateralism. The first rejection of bilateralism came after the First World War when many politicians concluded that the complex pre-war system of bilateral treaties had made war inevitable. This led to the creation of the multilateral League of Nations (which was disbanded in failure after 26 years).

A similar reaction against bilateral trade agreements occurred after the Great Depression, when it was argued that such agreements helped produce a cycle of rising tariffs that deepened the economic downturn. Thus, after the Second World War, the West turned to multilateral agreements such as the General Agreement on Tariffs and Trade (GATT).

Despite the high profile of modern multilateral systems such as the United Nations and World Trade Organization, most diplomacy is still done at the bilateral level. Bilateralism has a flexibility and ease lacking in most compromise-dependent multilateral systems. In addition, disparities in power, resources, money, armament, or technology are more easily exploitable by the stronger side in bilateral diplomacy, which powerful states might consider as a positive aspect of it, compared to the more consensus-driven multilateral form of diplomacy, where the one state-one vote rule applies.

A 2017 study found that bilateral tax treaties, even if intended to "coordinate policies between countries to avoid double taxation and encourage international investment", had the unintended consequence of allowing "multinationals to engage in treaty shopping, states' fiscal autonomy is limited, and governments tend to maintain lower tax rates."

== See also ==
- Asymmetric negotiation
- Bilateral trade
- Bilateral treaty
- List of bilateral free trade agreements
- Multilateralism
- Multistakeholderism
- Unilateralism
