= Seriousness =

Attitude of solemnity and earnestness

Seriousness (noun; adjective: serious) is an attitude of gravity, solemnity, persistence, and earnestness toward something considered to be of importance. Some notable philosophers and commentators have criticised excessive seriousness, while others have praised it. Seriousness is often contrasted with comedy, as in the seriocomedy. In the theory of humor, one must have a sense of humor and a sense of seriousness to distinguish what is supposed to be taken literally or not, or of being important or not. Otherwise, it may also be contrasted with a sense of play. How children learn a sense of seriousness to form values and differentiate between the serious and that which is not is studied in developmental psychology and educational psychology. There is a distinction between the degree of seriousness of various crimes in sentencing under the law, and also in law enforcement. There is a positive correlation with the degree of seriousness of a crime and viewer ratings of news coverage. What is or is not considered serious varies widely with different cultures.

Sometimes fields studying degrees of seriousness overlap, such as developmental psychology studies of development of the sense of degrees of seriousness as it relates to transgressions, which has overlap with criminology and the seriousness of crimes.

== Philosophical attitudes toward seriousness ==
=== Praise for "high seriousness" in scholarship and poetry ===
Some use "seriousness" as a term of praise for scholarship or in literary review. 19th century poet, cultural critic, and literary critic, Matthew Arnold said that the most important criteria used to judge the value of a poem were "high truth" and "high seriousness".

=== Philosophical disdain for seriousness ===
Many have expressed an attitude of disdain toward taking things too seriously, as opposed to viewing things with an attitude of humor. Poet, playwright, and philosopher Joseph Addison said that being serious is dull, "we are growing serious, and let me tell you, that's the next step to being dull." Political satirist P.J. O'Rourke said that "Seriousness is stupidity sent to college." Epigramist, poet, and playwright Oscar Wilde said that "life is too important to be taken seriously." In a play on words, novelist Samuel Butler indicated that the central serious conviction in life is that nothing should be taken with too much seriousness, "the one serious conviction that a man should have is that nothing is to be taken too seriously."

In some ascetic or puritan religious sects, an attitude of seriousness is always to be taken, and solemnity, sobriety, and puritanism with its hostility to social pleasures and indulgences are the only acceptable attitudes. Perry Miller, "the master of American intellectual history", wrote of excessive seriousness of the Puritans, "simple humanity cries at last for some relief from the interminable high seriousness of the Puritan code."

And yet Bernard Dukore, quoting Joy Goodwin, observes the mutually reinforcing facets of seriousness with humor, "[t]he fact that [an author] 'can write witty repartee and slapstick scenarios with the best of them doesn’t mean that his play doesn’t have deep roots.' [Ayckbourn] draws [his] comedy [in Intimate Exchanges] 'from some of the most distressing corners of the human heart.'" In a similar vein, the philosopher Ludwig Wittgenstein wrote “A serious and good philosophical work could be written consisting entirely of jokes.”

==== The "spirit of seriousness" in existential philosophy ====
Existentialist philosopher Jean-Paul Sartre called the "spirit of seriousness" the belief that there is an objective and independent goodness in things for people to discover, and that this belief leads to bad faith. He argued that people forget that values are not absolute, but are contingent and subjectively determined. In Sartre’s words, "the spirit of seriousness has two characteristics: it considers values as transcendent givens, independent of human subjectivity, and it transfers the quality of ‘desirable’ from the ontological structure of things to their simple material constitution."

== Seriousness and comedy ==
Seriousness is sometimes contrasted with the comical in humor. In the performing arts and literature, the seriocomedy is a genre which blends seriousness with the comical, drama with comedy.

== Measurement and detection ==
=== Detecting presence and absence of seriousness in humor ===
In the theory of humor, one must have a sense of humor and a sense of seriousness to distinguish what is supposed to be taken literally or not. An even more keen sense is needed when humor is used to make a serious point. Psychologists have studied how humor is intended to be taken as having seriousness, as when court jesters used humor to convey serious information. Conversely, when humor is not intended to be taken seriously, bad taste in humor may cross a line after which it is taken seriously, though not intended.

=== Detecting degree of seriousness in developmental psychology ===
In Developmental psychology and educational psychology, seriousness is studied as it relates to how children develop an ability to distinguish levels of seriousness as it relates to transgressions and expenditure of time; for example, a child must learn to distinguish between levels of seriousness in admonitions such as between "don't fidget" and "don't forget to look both ways when crossing the street", which have the same linguistic and normative structure, but different levels of seriousness.

=== Measuring degree of seriousness in crime ===
The degree of seriousness of crimes is an important factor relating to crime. One standard for measurement is the degree to which a crime affects others or society. A felony is generally considered to be a crime of "high seriousness", while a misdemeanor is not.

In criminal law the degree of seriousness is considered when meting out punishment to fit the crime, and in considering to what extent overcrowded prison facilities will be used. Seriousness of a crime is a major factor in considerations of the allocation of scarce law enforcement funds.

The meaning and measurement of seriousness is a major concern in public policy considerations. A quantitative scoring system called the "seriousness score" has been developed for use in allocating law enforcement resources and sentencing.

As to England and Wales, see section 143 of the Criminal Justice Act 2003.

=== Medical triage ===
Degrees of seriousness are used in medicine to make decisions about care. Seriousness is related to the effects of delaying or not having medical care. In an emergency hospital, the triage nurse must evaluate levels of seriousness of medical emergencies and rank them to determine order of care. Seriousness of illness is used to make decisions as to whether to perform invasive procedures such as surgery.

==== Measuring crime seriousness in the media ====
There is a positive correlation between the degree of seriousness of a crime and viewer ratings of news coverage.

=== Cultural variation in measurement and detection ===
What is considered serious varies widely across cultures and is studied in sociology, cultural anthropology, and criminology; being of the wrong religious faith may be considered a serious crime in some cultures; smoking marijuana may be a serious crime in some cultures and not others; homosexuality a serious crime in some cultures; and prostitution is a serious crime in some cultures. Perception of seriousness is measured in assessing varying cultural perceptions on health risks.
