= Ramon Pacheco Pardo =

Spanish academic

- Born: Madrid, Spain
- Education: London School of Economics and Political Science (LSE) (PhD)
- Occupation: International Relations professor

Ramon Pacheco Pardo is Professor of International Relations at King's College London and the KF-VUB Korea Chair at Vrije Universiteit Brussel.

== Education and career ==
Pacheco Pardo first lived in South Korea in 2003 as a student. He received his PhD in International Relations from LSE. Pacheco Pardo is a professor at King's College London and became KF-VUB Korea Chair in October 2017. He was editor of Millennium: Journal of International Studies in 2009–10. Pacheco Pardo has testified on Korean Peninsula affairs before the European Parliament. In 2021 he was appointed Adjunct Fellow at CSIS.

== Publications ==
Pacheco Pardo has written peer-reviewed articles, chapters and op-eds on North Korea's foreign relations and domestic affairs, South Korea's foreign policy and domestic affairs, inter-Korean relations and Europe-Asia relations. Pacheco Pardo is the author of "North Korea-US Relations Under Kim Jong Il: The Quest for Normalization?", where he argues that North Korea's main foreign policy goal is to normalize diplomatic relations with the United States to boost its security and launch economic reform. It has been among the top-selling North Korea books in South Korea. He has advocated engagement with North Korea to improve the situation in the Korean Peninsula.

He is the author of Shrimp to Whale: South Korea from the Forgotten War to K-Pop, a history of South Korea since its foundation in 1948 to the 2022 presidential election. The book analyses the political, economic, social and cultural evolution of the country over the decades. The book was reviewed in The Chosun Ilbo, Financial Times, The Korea Herald and the New Statesman. The book has been translated into Korean, receiving positive reviews from Dong-A Ilbo, Hankook Gyeongje or JoongAng Ilbo. The Korean translation has been a recommended book by multiple South Korean media. It has also been a bestselling book in different booksellers.

Pacheco Pardo is also co-author of Korea: A New History of South and North together with Victor Cha. The book is a history of Korea and the two separate Koreas from the late 19th century to the 2020s. It has been translated into different languages including Italian, Polish and Portuguese.

In the book South Korea's Grand Strategy: Making Its Own Destiny, Pacheco Pardo argues that South Korea has a well-defined grand strategy dating back to its transition to democracy in 1987–88. He argues that South Korea's top priority is to be able to have independence of action by being able to make is own foreign policy and security decisions without external influence. The book has been translated into traditional Chinese for the Taiwanese market.

Books

- North Korea-US Relations under Kim Jong Il: The Quest for Normalization?, Routledge, 2014 ISBN 9780415750394
- North Korea-US Relations from Kim Jong Il to Kim Jong Un, 2nd ed, Routledge, 2019 ISBN 9780367198145
- Shrimp to Whale: South Korea from the Forgotten War to K-Pop, Hurst and Oxford University Press, 2022 ISBN 9780197659656
- Korea: A New History of South and North, Yale University Press, 2023 ISBN 9780300278705
- South Korea's Grand Strategy: Making Its Own Destiny (Contemporary Asia in the World), Columbia University Press, 2023 ISBN 9790231203233
- North Korea: Survival of a Political Dynasty (Flashpoints), Agenda Publishing, 2024 ISBN 9781788216944
