= Kalevi Holsti =

Kalevi Jaakko Holsti, FRSC (born 1935) is a Finnish-Canadian political scientist.

Kal Holsti and his elder brother Ole were born in Geneva, while their father Rudolf served as Finland's ambassador to the League of Nations. Following the outbreak of World War II, the Holsti family was unable to return to Finland, and instead settled in the United States, where Rudolf held a visiting professorship at Stanford University. Kal and Ole lived with the families of Rudolf's Stanford colleagues after he died, as Liisa, their mother, had been hospitalized since 1943 with tuberculosis.

Kal Holsti entered Stanford as an undergraduate in 1952 and completed a doctorate at the institution in 1961. He later immigrated to Canada and became a professor at the University of British Columbia (UBC) in 1970. Between 1978 and 1982, Holsti was co-editor of the Canadian Journal of Political Science. In 1983, he was elected a fellow of the Royal Society of Canada. Between 1984 and 1985, Holsti was president of the Canadian Political Science Association. Holsti subsequently led the International Studies Association as president from 1986 to 1987. From 1997 to 1999, Holsti held the University Killam Professorship at UBC.
