= Multilateralism =

Alliance between multiple countries in pursuit of a common goal

In international relations, multilateralism refers to an alliance of multiple countries pursuing a common goal. Multilateralism is based on the principles of inclusivity, equality, and cooperation, and aims to foster a more peaceful, prosperous, and sustainable world. Middle powers play a crucial role in the international system by promoting multilateralism and internationalism.

One of the key advantages of multilateralism is that it enables countries to solve problems that transcend national boundaries, such as climate change, terrorism, and pandemics, through shared responsibility and burden-sharing. However, multilateralism has challenges. The rise of populism, nationalism, and protectionism in some countries has raised concerns about the future of multilateralism and the effectiveness of international cooperation.

== Definitions ==
Multilateralism, in the form of membership in international institutions, serves to bind powerful nations, discourage unilateralism, and gives small powers a voice and influence that they could not otherwise exercise. For a small power to influence a great power, the Lilliputian strategy of small countries banding together to collectively bind a larger one can be effective. Similarly, multilateralism may allow one great power to influence another great power. For a great power, seeking control through bilateral ties could be costly; it may require bargaining and compromise with the other great power.

Miles Kahler defines multilateralism as "international governance" or global governance of the "many", and its central principle was "opposition [to] bilateral discriminatory arrangements that were believed to enhance the leverage of the powerful over the weak and to increase international conflict."; Robert Keohane defined it as "the practice of coordinating national policies in groups of three or more states."

John Ruggie further elaborated the concept in his influential writings on multilateralism. Based on principles of "indivisibility" and "diffuse reciprocity he defined it as "an institutional form which coordinates relations among three or more states based on 'generalized' principles of conduct ... which specify appropriate conduct for a class of actions, without regard to particularistic interests of the parties or the strategic exigencies that may exist in any occurrence." He further clarified that multilateralism is 'a unique product of US global hegemony [. . . ] not necessarily a post-war American invention', but a reflection of post-war 'American hegemony'.

Embedding the target state in a multilateral alliance reduces the costs borne by the power-seeking control, but it also offers the same binding benefits of the Lilliputian strategy. Furthermore, if a small power seeks control over another small power, multilateralism may be the only choice, because small powers rarely have the resources to exert control on their own. As such, power disparities are accommodated to the weaker states by having more predictable bigger states and means to achieve control through collective action. Powerful states also buy into multilateral agreements by writing the rules and having privileges such as veto power and special status.

International organizations, such as the United Nations (UN) and the World Trade Organization, are multilateral in nature. The main proponents of multilateralism have traditionally been the middle powers, such as Canada, Australia, Switzerland, the Benelux countries and the Nordic countries. Larger states often act unilaterally, while smaller ones may have little direct power in international affairs aside from participation in the United Nations (by consolidating their UN vote in a voting bloc with other nations, for example.) Multilateralism may involve several nations acting together, as in the UN, or may involve regional or military alliances, pacts, or groupings, such as NATO. These multilateral institutions are not imposed on states but are created and accepted by them to increase their ability to seek their own interests through the coordination of their policies. Moreover, they serve as frameworks that constrain opportunistic behaviour and encourage coordination by facilitating the exchange of information about the actual behaviour of states regarding the standards to which they have consented.

The term "regional multilateralism" has been proposed by Harris Mylonas and Emirhan Yorulmazlar, suggesting that "contemporary problems can be better solved at the regional rather than the bilateral or global levels" and that bringing together the concept of regional integration with that of multilateralism is necessary in today's world. Regionalism dates from the time of the earliest development of political communities, where economic and political relations naturally had a strong regionalist focus due to restrictions on technology, trade, and communications.

The converse of multilateralism is unilateralism, in terms of political philosophy. Other authors have used the term "minilateralism" to refer to the fewest states required to get the biggest results through this institutional form.

The foreign policy that India formulated after independence reflected its idiosyncratic culture and political traditions. Speaking in the Lok Sabha, the lower house of the Parliament of India, in March 1950, Nehru affirmed: "It should not be supposed that we are starting on a clean slate. It is a policy that flowed from our recent history and our national movement and its development and various ideals, we have proclaimed." (Nehru, 1961, p. 34). In fact, the foreign policy culture of India is an elite culture, meaning, in effect, that the writings and speeches of select leading figures of the Indian foreign policy elite provide an insight into the key ideas and norms constituting the foundation of India's foreign policy.

== History ==
One modern instance of multilateralism occurred in the nineteenth century in Europe after the end of the Napoleonic Wars, where the great powers met to redraw the map of Europe at the Congress of Vienna (November 1814 to June 1815). The Concert of Europe, as it became known, was a group of great and lesser powers that would meet to resolve issues peacefully. Conferences such as the Conference of Berlin in 1884 helped reduce power conflicts during this period, and the 19th century was one of Europe's most peaceful.

Industrial and colonial competition, combined with shifts in the balance of power after the creation - by diplomacy and conquest - of Germany by Prussia meant cracks were appearing in this system by the turn of the 20th century. The concert system was utterly destroyed by the First World War. After that conflict, world leaders created the League of Nations (which became the precursor of the United Nations) in an attempt to prevent a similar conflict. Although the League of Nations failed in its security mission, it initiated a variety of specialized organizations that continue to operate today. Moreover, although the US did not join, it did provide a degree of support from individual Americans and American philanthropies that started a tradition of public and private participation.

After the Second World War the victors, drawing upon experience from the League's failure, created the United Nations in 1945. Since then, the "breadth and diversity" of multilateral arrangements have escalated. Unlike the League, the UN had the active participation of the United States and the Soviet Union, the world's then greatest contemporary powers. Along with the political institutions of the UN, the post-war years also saw the development of organizations such as the General Agreement on Tariffs and Trade (GATT) (now the World Trade Organization), the World Bank, and the International Monetary Fund (IMF) (the so-called 'Bretton Woods' institutions), and other technical institutions that were part of the UN system—including the World Health Organization. Formation of these and other subsequent bodies under the United Nations made the new system more powerful than the old League system. Moreover, United Nations peacekeepers stationed around the world became a visible symbol of multilateralism. Later, the North Atlantic Treaty Organization (NATO) was formed as a defensive alliance that used the multilateral form to promote collective security in the postwar era.

Multilateral institutions of varying scope and subject matter range from the International Telecommunication Union (ITU) to the World Intellectual Property Organization (WIPO) and Organisation for the Prohibition of Chemical Weapons (OPCW)

== Challenges ==
The multilateral system has encountered mounting challenges since the end of the Cold War.

=== Geopolitical fragmentation ===
The United States became increasingly influential in the international sphere due to the growth of its military and economic power. This growing dominance has led countries such as Iran, China and India to question the relevance of the UN and other multilateral bodies. Concurrently, a perception developed among internationalists such as former UN Secretary-General Kofi Annan, that the United States is more inclined to act unilaterally in situations with international implications. This trend began when the U.S. Senate, in October 1999, refused to ratify the Comprehensive Test Ban Treaty, which President Bill Clinton had signed in September 1996. Under President George W. Bush the United States rejected such multilateral agreements as the Kyoto Protocol, the International Criminal Court, the Ottawa Treaty banning anti-personnel land mines and a draft protocol to ensure compliance by States with the Biological Weapons Convention. Additionally under the George W. Bush administration, the United States withdrew from the Anti-Ballistic Missile Treaty, which the Richard Nixon administration and the Soviet Union had signed in 1972.

Other major powers have posed additional challenges to the contemporary multilateral model. Russia has leveraged its position in multilateral bodies to prevent consensus votes on various international issues, which has limited the power and mobility of multilateral action. Additionally, emerging powers such as India, Brazil and South Africa have challenged the structure of existing international institutions which reflect post-1945 global power distributions.

This fragmentation is signaled by the rise of minilateral groupings: smaller coalitions of select states. The formation of coalitions such as the Quad and AUKUS have signaled that strategic cooperation has shifted outside traditional multilateral frameworks towards bilateralism. Countries are drawn to these pacts which "present a vision to ensure the peace and stability of [their] region and address some common security challenges".

These challenges presented by the U.S. could be explained by a strong belief in bilateral alliances as instruments of control. Liberal institutionalists would argue, though, that great powers might still opt for a multilateral alliance. But great powers can amplify their capabilities to control small powers and maximize their leverage by forging a series of bilateral arrangements with allies, rather than see that leverage diluted in a multilateral forum. Arguably, the Bush administration favoured bilateralism over multilateralism, or even unilateralism, for similar reasons. Rather than going it alone or going it with others, the administration opted for intensive one-on-one relationships with handpicked countries that maximized the U.S. capacity to achieve its objectives.

=== Sovereignty and nationalism ===
Another challenge in global governance through multilateralism involves national sovereignty. Regardless of the erosion of nation-states' legal and operational sovereignty in international relations, "nation-states remain the ultimate locus of authoritative decision making regarding most facets of public and private life". Hoffman asserted that nation-states are "unlikely to embrace abstract obligations that clash with concrete calculations of national interest."

=== Erosion of institutional legitimacy and inequality ===
Multilateral institutions face growing legitimacy challenges, as there is a perceived inequality in their rules and decision-making processes. The central example of this issue is the UN Security Council which reflects the post-1945 global power distribution rather than modern realities. Growing nations such as India, South Africa, and Brazil argue that they lack representation on this council despite their increased prominence. Critics argue that existing global institutions disproportionately privilege Western states in their governance structures, voting systems, and policy priorities, undermining their legitimacy among developing nations.

Global multilateralism is challenged, particularly with respect to trade, by regional arrangements such as the European Union and NAFTA, although these are not in themselves incompatible with larger accords. The original sponsor of post-war multilateralism in economic regimes, the United States, turned towards unilateral action and in trade and other negotiations as a result of dissatisfaction with the outcomes of multilateral fora. As the most powerful nation, the United States had the least to lose from abandoning multilateralism; the weakest nations have the most to lose, but the cost for all would be high. Aside from changes in the US, populism in Europe has proven to be problematic to multilateralism in recent years. Results from direct elections to the European Parliament give evidence to this claim, as Eurosceptic parties have made advances.

=== Modern challenges ===
Issue-specific challenges have revealed fundamental weaknesses in existing multilateral structures.

The COVID-19 pandemic exposed various short-comings in global health institutions and their dependency on multilateral coordination. Multilateral bodies such as the WHO were unable to enforce effective data sharing and an equitable distribution of resources during the pandemic. Multiple barriers such as a lack of standardized data formats, an absence of legal frameworks, and competing national interests that prioritized domestic concerns, all contributed to the struggle to effectively facilitate data sharing between nations during the pandemic, even though the technical capabilities and frameworks for such sharing existed. Resource allocation was hindered due to tensions over perceived unequal commitments between developed and developing nations. This global crisis revealed that multilateral health institutions lacked the collaboration and strength to provide an effective collective response.

Multilateral action against climate change has encountered similar challenges. Countries have been slow to implement their commitments to reduce emissions and there has been persistent arguments over responsibility distribution between developed and developing nations.

The rapid advancement of technology has strained contemporary multilateral models, particularly the rise of artificial intelligence. Nations have individually implemented varying regulations for these technologies which has fragmented global landscape for digital governance. This fragmentation in digital governance reflects the domestic drive for control over data, digital infrastructure, and technological standards within territorial boundaries. These competing frameworks hinder collaboration and consensus of regulation in the digital sphere. This complicates multilateral efforts to address international challenges such as cybersecurity threats, data flows between nations, and the governance of rapidly advancing technologies like artificial intelligence.

== Comparison with bilateralism ==
Powerplay: Bilateral versus Multilateral Control
	Target State: Small Power	Target State: Great Power
Small power(s) seeking control over target	Quadrant 1 multilateralism	Quadrant 2 multilateralism
Great power seeking control over target	Quadrant 3 bilateralism	Quadrant 4 multilateralism
Source: Victor Cha's Powerplay: Bilateral versus Multilateral Control.

When enacting foreign policies, governments face a choice between unilateralism, bilateralism and multilateralism.

Bilateralism means coordination with another single country. Multilateralism has attempted to find common ground based on generalized principles of conduct, in addition to details associated with a particular agreement. Victor Cha argued that: power asymmetries predict the type of structures, bilateral or multilateral, that offer the most control. If small powers try to control a larger one, then multilateralism is effective. But if great powers seek control over smaller ones, bilateral alliances are more effective.

Thus, a country's decision to select bilateralism or multilateralism when enacting foreign policies is greatly affected by its size and power, as well as the size and power of the country over which it seeks to control. Take the example of Foreign Policy of the United States. Many references discuss how the United States interacts with other nations. In particular, the United States chose multilateralism in Europe and decided to form NATO, while it formed bilateral alliances, or the Hub and spokes architecture, in East Asia. Although there are many arguments about the reasons for this, Cha's "powerplay" theory provides one possible reason. He argued:

...postwar U.S planners had to contend with a region uniquely constituted of potential rogue allies, through their aggressive behaviour, could potentially entrap the United States in an unwanted wider war in Asia... To avoid this outcome, the United States created a series of tight, deep bilateral alliances with Taiwan, South Korea, and Japan through which it could exercise maximum control and prevent unilateral aggression. Furthermore, it did not seek to make these bilateral alliances multilateral, because it wanted to amplify U.S. control and minimize any collusion among its partners.

== See also ==
- ASEAN
- Asymmetric negotiation
- East Asian Summit
- European Union
- Hegemony
- Internationalism (politics)
- Intergovernmental organization
- New world order (politics)
- North American Free Trade Agreement
- Open Government Partnership
- Perpetual peace
- Plurinationalism
- Polarity in international relations
- World Federation of United Nations Associations
