= Inherent bad faith model =

Theory in political psychology

The inherent bad faith model of information processing is a theory in political psychology that was first put forth by Ole Holsti to explain the relationship between John Foster Dulles's beliefs and model of information processing.

It is the most widely studied model of one's opponent. A state is presumed to be implacably hostile, and contra-indicators of that are dismissed as propaganda ploys or signs of weakness or otherwise ignored. Examples are Dulles's position on the Soviet Union and Israel's initial position on the Palestine Liberation Organization.

== See also ==
- Bad faith
