= Ole Holsti =

American-Finnish political scientist (1933–2020)

Olavi Rudolf Holsti (August 7, 1933 – July 2, 2020) was a Finnish-American political scientist and academic. He held the position of George V. Allen Professor Emeritus of Political Science at Duke University. He was noted for his writings on international affairs, American foreign policy, content analysis, decision-making in politics and diplomacy, and crises.

Holsti was born in Geneva, Switzerland, on August 7, 1933. Holsti received his Bachelor of Arts degree from Stanford University in 1954, his Master of Arts in Teaching from Wesleyan University in 1956, and his Ph.D from Stanford University in 1962.

Holsti worked at Stanford University as an instructor in the Department of Political Science (1962–1965), the research coordinator and associate director of Studies in International Conflict and Integration (1962–1967) and assistant professor in the Department of Political Science, (1965–1967). He moved to the University of British Columbia in 1967, working as assistant professor in the Department of Political Science (1967–1971) before becoming a professor (1971–1974).

Holsti was at the University of California, Davis, as a professor in the Department of Political Science (1978–1979) before joining the faculty of Duke University as George V. Allen Professor in the Department of Political Science (1974–1998). He became a professor emeritus in 1998.

Holsti's brother Kal is also a political scientist. Their father, Rudolf Holsti, served as Finland's foreign minister.

== Inherent bad faith model of information processing in political psychology ==
The "inherent bad faith model" of information processing is a theory in political psychology that was first put forth by Holsti to explain the relationship between John Foster Dulles's beliefs and model of information processing. It is the most widely studied model of one's opponent. A state is presumed to be implacably hostile, and contra-indicators of that are ignored and are dismissed as propaganda ploys or signs of weakness. Examples are Dulles's position on the Soviet Union and Israel's initial position on the Palestine Liberation Organization.
