= Asymmetric negotiation =

Asymmetric negotiation is a process which that occurs when counterparts of significantly different sizes, as measured by the parties' relative resources and market share in a particular context, seek to negotiate with each other. The context for these negotiations or conflicts can range from mergers and acquisitions and international trade deals, to hostage-takings and initiating change at a local school board. This specific form of negotiation contrasts with symmetrical or standard negotiations where the parties are more similar in size.

A larger party in one context can be a smaller party in another. For instance, a US corporation may be a much larger buyer in an asymmetric negotiation with a North American supplier, while reduced to being a relatively small player overseas in negotiations with the European Union where it has fewer resources and less impact.

Just as in asymmetric warfare, research has shown that smaller players can prevail in getting what they want from much larger players by applying distinct approaches, strategies and tactics that increase their odds of success.

== History ==
Given the growing number of large corporations and government entities worldwide, and the corresponding growth in asymmetric negotiations, this phenomenon has received increasing attention in recent decades, with numerous journalists and academics addressing the subject in articles and journals. International negotiator Peter D. Johnston's book Negotiating with Giants provides an in-depth survey of "size-imbalanced" negotiations. In this 2008 book, Johnston studied more than 100 negotiations from across history to the present day, where smaller players got what they wanted from much larger players, with the author identifying unique strategies that worked for these "Davids" in their negotiations with wide-ranging giants or "Goliaths."

== Strategies for smaller players ==
According to Johnston, successful smaller players should change the game on their larger counterparts by using seven distinct approaches given the unique challenges they face in asymmetric negotiations:

1. They should defend themselves from the start, earlier than one might normally expect, including defenses for their reputations, ideas and information to ensure that hurting them won't be as easy as it could be otherwise.
2. They should negotiate away from the negotiation table as long as possible to even the playing field with larger counterparts, making themselves bigger and stronger before meeting face-to-face—if and only if that is ever required.
3. They should draw on seven different types of "helpers" that smaller players across history have employed to their benefit: Decision-makers, Influencers, Arm-Twisters, Networkers, Allies, Counselors and Informants.
4. They should find rules and laws to undermine larger players, join them to weaken them from the inside, or remove key assets that contribute to their strengths.
5. They should act unilaterally and unpredictably when it meets their interests, using their smaller size to react swiftly and catch their giants flat-footed, often by pursuing their back-up plans.
6. They should weave together their different negotiations and operating decisions to maximize value in any single negotiation, a strategy referred to by the author as "integrated negotiation".
7. They should think differently about building rapport and trust, focusing on positives that connect them to their giants, modeling desired behaviors, building trust incrementally, and redefining trust by knowing that they can always trust larger players will act consistent with what they perceive to be in their own best interests.

== Examples ==
=== Historical cases ===
- Magna Carta, the Barons and King John. In 1215, Magna Carta, Europe's first written constitution guaranteeing basic rights for citizens, was agreed to by King John, but only after the land-owning Barons weakened the Monarch by claiming London as their own. The Barons would only relinquish control of the city once they saw that the Crown had followed through on its commitments related to Magna Carta.
- Harriet Beecher Stowe and the abolition of slavery in the United States. As a housewife and abolitionist in 1851, Stowe wrote the novel Uncle Tom's Cabin, drawing attention to the evils of slavery. The book, second only to the Bible in worldwide readership by the end of the 1800s, helped forge a broad coalition of abolitionists, enabling Stowe to influence the creation of the Republican Party, the choice of Abraham Lincoln as president, and ultimately, the end of slavery in the United States.
- Rachel Carson and the environmental movement. In the 1950s, the scientist uncovered troubling links between bird deaths and pesticides, soon linking cancer to chemical usage and building a coalition of environmentalists through her non-fiction bestselling book, Silent Spring. Her influence helped lead to the banning of DDT, the establishment of America's Environmental Protection Agency, and the early development of the environmental movement itself.

=== Contemporary examples ===
- The 1989 Canada–United States Free Trade Agreement between Canada and the United States. Rather than continuing to negotiate a series of smaller bilateral trade deals by sector, Canada at one-tenth the size of America, reached a wide-ranging trade agreement. The deal was large enough to attract the attention of its southern neighbor, while valuable enough to the Americans to ensure Canada could also negotiate important protections for its culture, healthcare and education.
- Friends, Warner Brothers, and Courteney Cox. When the Friends television show quickly became a sensation in the mid-1990s, Cox (Monica), the highest profile member of the cast at the time, could have easily commanded the largest salary increase for herself. Instead, she rallied David Schwimmer (Ross) and their other four main cast members into a coalition to negotiate as one with more collective clout. This led to the same immediate financial gains for each actor, culminating in each actor being paid $1 million per episode by the end of the show's run in 2004.
- Ashley Smith and hostage-taker Brian Nichols. In March 2005, Smith was taken hostage by Nichols in her Atlanta apartment, and managed in fewer than eight hours to build rapport, trust and mutual understanding with the armed killer, reading excerpts from The Purpose-Driven Life and the Bible, before he let her go unscathed. She was later one of the key witnesses against Nichols, who was found guilty of a range of crimes and sentenced to multiple life sentences.
