= Victor Cha =

American political scientist (born 1960)

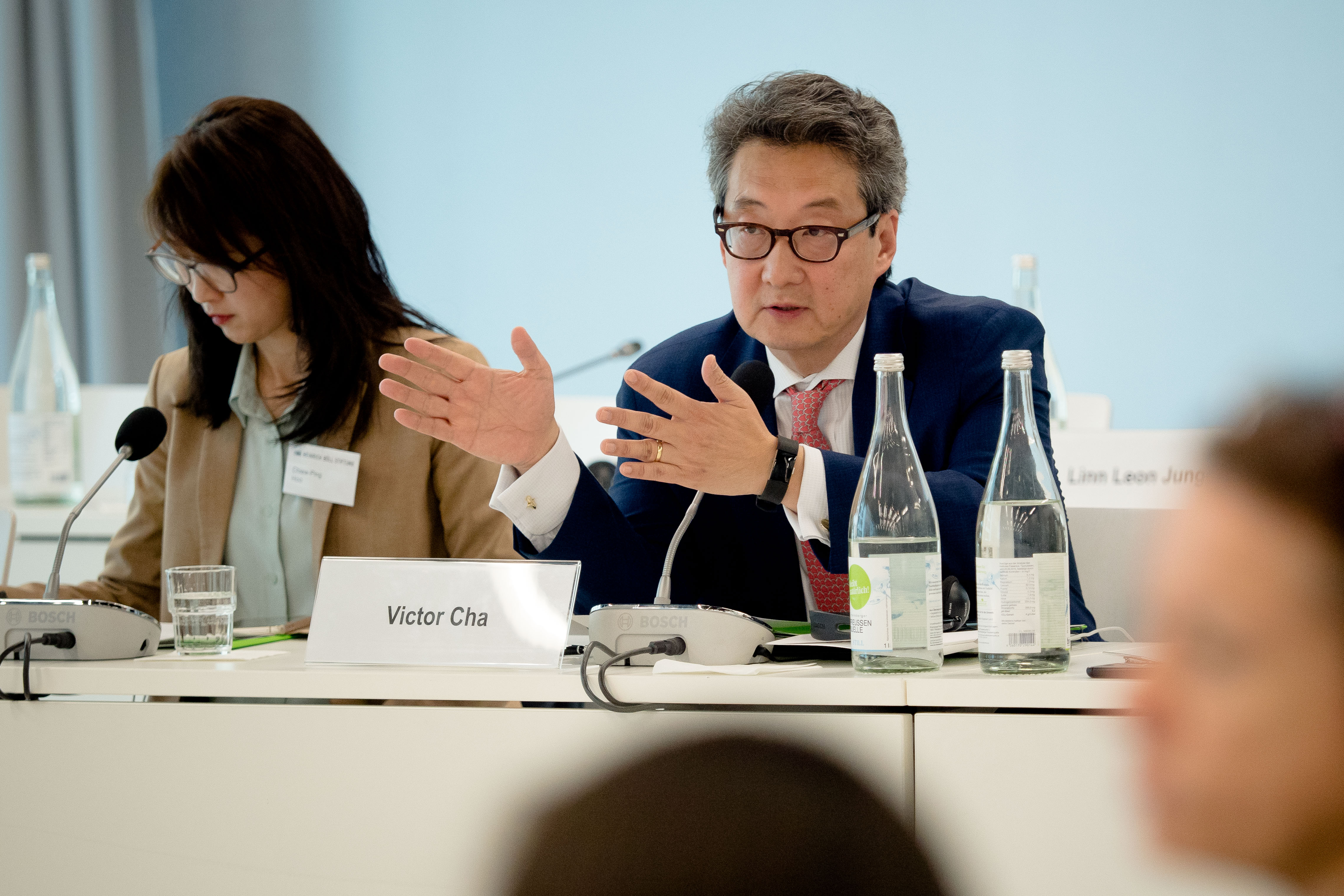
- Cha in 2018
- Born: October 27, 1961 (age 64); New York City, New York, United States
- Other name: Cha Yu-deok
- Education: Columbia University (BA, MIA, PhD); Hertford College, Oxford (MA)
- Occupations: Political scientist, former senior U.S. security official
- Employer(s): Georgetown University, Center for Strategic and International Studies
- Political party: Republican

Victor D. Cha (Korean: 차유덕; RR: Cha Yu-deok, born 1960) is an American political scientist currently serving as president of the Geopolitics and Foreign Policy Department and Korea Chair at the Center for Strategic and International Studies (CSIS).

He is a former Director for Asian Affairs at the White House National Security Council (NSC) during the George W. Bush administration, with responsibility for Japan, North and South Korea, Australia, and New Zealand. He was George W. Bush's top advisor on North Korean affairs. He holds the D.S. Song-Korea Foundation Chair in Asian Studies and previously served as Director of the Asian Studies program in the Edmund A. Walsh School of Foreign Service at Georgetown University.

== Early life and education ==
Cha's father came to the U.S. from South Korea to study at Columbia University in 1954. Cha was born in the early 1960s in the United States. He received a BA in economics from Columbia University in 1983, an MA in philosophy, politics, and economics from Hertford College, Oxford, in 1986, an MIA from Columbia, and a PhD in political science from Columbia in 1994 with a dissertation titled Alignment despite antagonism: Japan and Korea as quasi-allies.

== Career ==
Cha is a former John M. Olin National Security Fellow at Harvard University, two-time Fulbright Scholar, Hoover National Fellow, and Center for International Security and Cooperation (CISAC) Fellow at Stanford University.

He held the D. S. Song-Korea Foundation Chair in Asian Studies and Government in the Walsh School of Foreign Service and directed the American Alliances in Asia Project at Georgetown University until 2004.

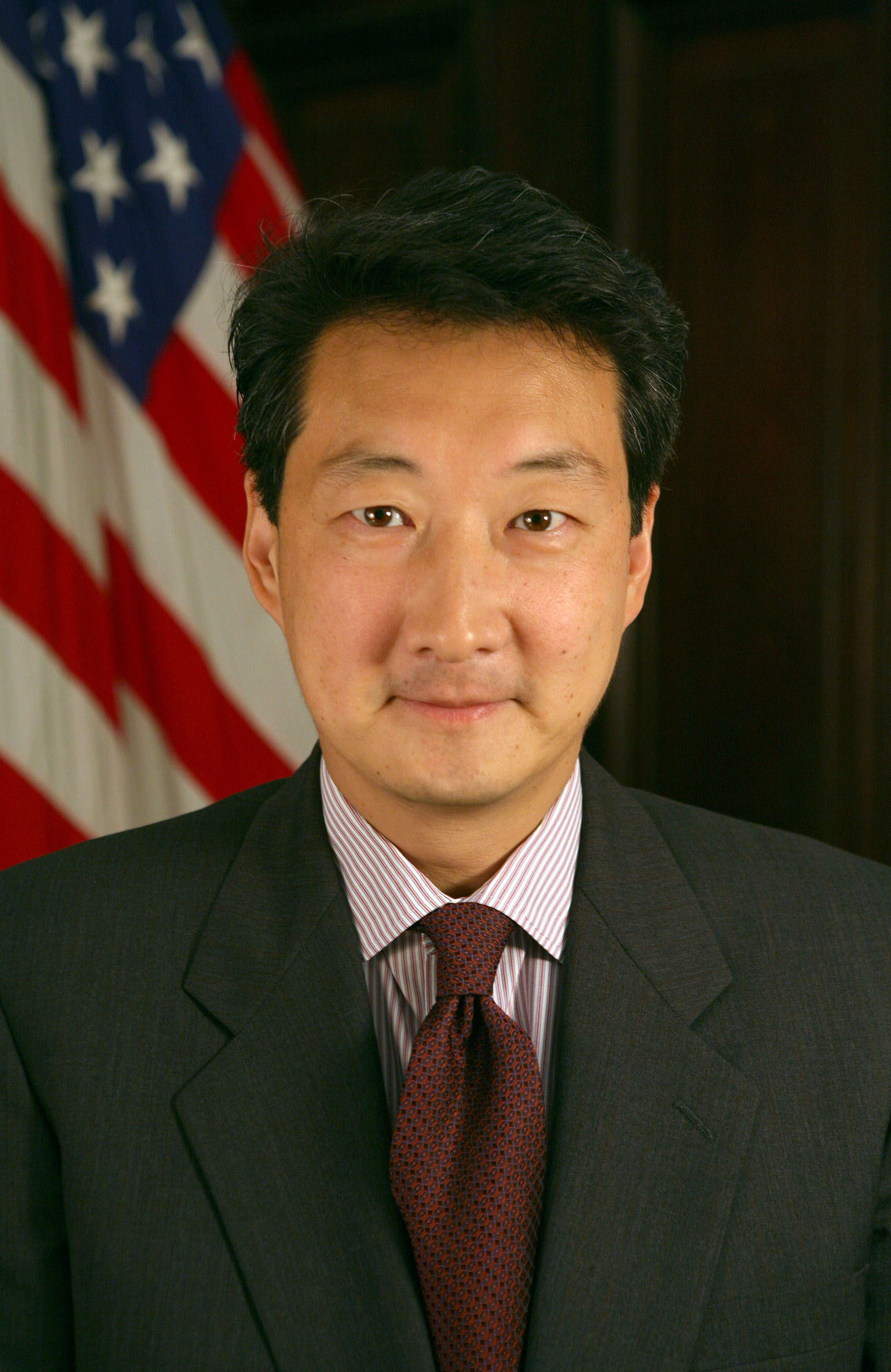
Cha in 2006

In December 2004, Cha joined the National Security Council as Director for Asian Affairs. At the NSC, he was responsible for South Korea, North Korea, Japan, Australia, New Zealand, and the Pacific Island nations. He also served as the U.S. Deputy Head of Delegation for the Six Party Talks. Cha received two Outstanding Service commendations during his tenure at the White House.

Cha returned to Georgetown in late 2007 after public service leave. Currently, he is the inaugural holder of the D.S. Song-Korea Foundation Chair in Asian studies and a joint appointment with the School of Foreign Service core faculty and the Department of Government and is the Director of the Asian Studies program. He is also a senior adviser at the CSIS on Asian affairs.

It was reported in January 2018 that the Trump administration expected to withdraw his nomination for U.S. Ambassador to South Korea. Cha had reportedly in December 2017 privately expressed disagreement with the Trump administration's consideration to launch a limited strike at North Korea and to withdraw from the United States–Korea Free Trade Agreement. Cha later praised the summit meetings between Donald Trump and Kim Jong-un for peacefully resolving the 2017–2018 North Korea crisis, calling the 2018 North Korea–United States Singapore Summit "the start of a diplomatic process that takes us away from the brink of war."

In 2020, Cha, along with over 130 other former Republican national security officials, signed a statement asserting that Trump was unfit to serve another term. They wrote: "To that end, we are firmly convinced that it is in the best interest of our nation that Vice President Joe Biden be elected as the next President of the United States, and we will vote for him."

Cha is a member of the Defense Policy Board Advisory Committee.

== Publications ==
Cha is the author of numerous articles, books, and other works on Asian security.

He authored Alignment Despite Antagonism: The US-Korea-Japan Security Triangle (1999), which received the 2000 Ohira Book Prize. The book presented a new, alternative theory regarding Japan and South Korea's political alignment despite their historical animosity. Cha wrote this in response to previous research on the subject, which he felt focused too heavily on their respective historical antagonism.

In 2005, Cha co-authored Nuclear North Korea: A Debate on Engagement Strategies with Professor David Kang of Dartmouth College and its Tuck School of Business. The co-authors presented their respective viewpoints on the best way to handle the Korean conflict, with Cha presenting a more "hawkish" approach and Kang presenting his more "dovish" arguments.

Cha published Beyond the Final Score: The Politics of Sport in Asia in 2009. In 2012 he published The Impossible State: North Korea, Past and Future. Cha published a book on East Asian security in 2016, Powerplay: The Origins of the American Alliance System in Asia. His most recent book presents and analyses modern Korean history and was co-authored with Ramon Pacheco Pardo, Korea: A New History of South & North.

He has published articles on international relations and East Asia in International Security, Foreign Affairs, Survival, Political Science Quarterly, International Studies Quarterly, Orbis, Armed Forces and Society, Journal of Peace Research, Security Dialogue, Australian Journal of International Affairs, Asian Survey, Journal of East Asian Studies, Asian Perspective, the Japanese Journal of Political Science and The Washington Post.

Recent publications include "Winning Asia: An Untold American Foreign Policy Success" in the November/December 2007 issue of Foreign Affairs; "Beijing's Olympic-Sized Catch 22" in the Summer 2008 issue of the Washington Quarterly; and "Powerplay Origins of the U.S. Alliance System in Asia" in the Winter 2009/10 issue of International Security.

=== Books ===
- The Geneva Framework Agreement and Korea's Future, East Asian Institute, Columbia University, 1995
- Alignment Despite Antagonism: The United States-Korea-Japan Security Triangle (Studies of the Weatherhead East Asian Institute, Columbia University), Stanford University Press, 2000 ISBN 9780804731928
- Nuclear North Korea: A Debate on Engagement Strategies, Columbia University Press, 2005 (with David C. Kang)
- Beyond the Final Score: The Politics of Sport in Asia (Contemporary Asia in the World), Columbia University Press, 2008 ISBN 9780231154901
- The Impossible State: North Korea, Past and Future, Ecco/HarperCollins, 2012 ISBN 9780061998515
- Powerplay: The Origins of the American Alliance System in Asia, Princeton University Press, 2016 ISBN 9780691144535
- Korea: A New History of South & North, Yale University Press, 2023 (with Ramon Pacheco Pardo)

=== Reports ===
- Breaking Bad: South Korea's Nuclear Option, CSIS, April 29, 2024

=== Articles ===
- Eyes Wide Open: Strategic Elite Views of South Korea’s Nuclear Options, Washington Quarterly, July 8, 2024
- America’s Asian Partners Are Not Worried Enough About Trump, Foreign Affairs, June 26, 2024
- America Needs to Reassure Japan and South Korea, Foreign Affairs, February 9, 2023
- How to Stop Chinese Coercion, Foreign Affairs, December 14, 2022
- Complex Patchworks: U.S. Alliances as Part of Asia's Regional Architecture (Asia Policy, January 2011)
- Korea: A Peninsula in Crisis and Flux in Strategic Asia 2004–05: Confronting Terrorism in the Pursuit of Power (National Bureau of Asian Research, 2004)
- South Korea: Anchored or Adrift? in Strategic Asia 2003–04: Fragility and Crisis (National Bureau of Asian Research, 2003)
- Defensive Realism and Japan's Approach toward Korean Reunification (NBR Analysis, 2003)

== Personal life ==
Cha lives in Maryland with his wife and two sons.
