= Foreign policy of the Nixon administration =

The US foreign policy during the presidency of Richard Nixon (1969–1974) focused on reducing the dangers of the Cold War among the Soviet Union and China. President Richard Nixon's policy sought détente with both nations, which were hostile to the U.S. and to each other in the wake of the Sino-Soviet split.

He moved away from the traditional American policy of containment of communism, hoping each side would seek American favor. Nixon's 1972 visit to China ushered in a new era of U.S.-China relations and effectively removed China as a Cold War foe. The Nixon administration signed the Anti-Ballistic Missile Treaty with the Soviet Union and organized a conference that led to the signing of the Helsinki Accords after Nixon left office.

When Nixon took office, the United States had approximately 500,000 soldiers stationed in Southeast Asia as part of an effort to aid South Vietnam in the Vietnam War. Nixon implemented a policy of "Vietnamization", carrying out phased withdrawals of U.S. soldiers and shifting combat roles to Vietnamese troops. As peace negotiations continually bogged down, Nixon ordered major bombing campaigns in Vietnam, Cambodia, and Laos. The U.S., South Vietnam, and North Vietnam agreed to the Paris Peace Accords in early 1973, and the U.S. subsequently withdrew its remaining soldiers in South Vietnam. The war resumed as North Vietnam and South Vietnam violated the truce, and in 1975 North Vietnam captured Saigon and completed the reunification of Vietnam. His initiatives were in many ways continued in the foreign policy of the Gerald Ford administration.

== Leadership ==
=== Appointments ===
Nixon's 1969 foreign policy team

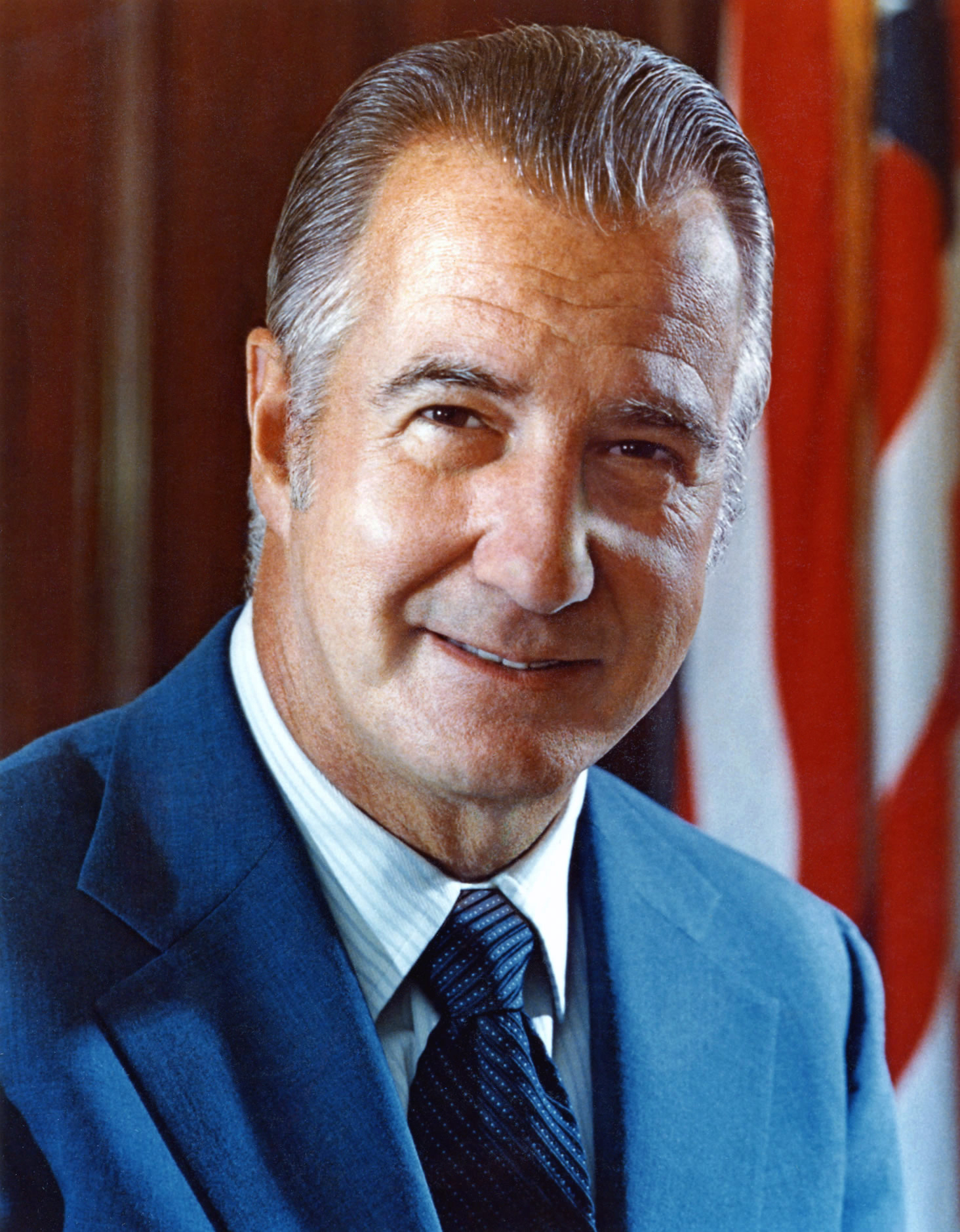
Spiro Agnew (1918–1996)

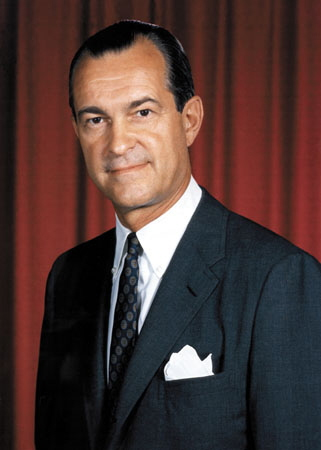
Richard Helms (1913–2002)

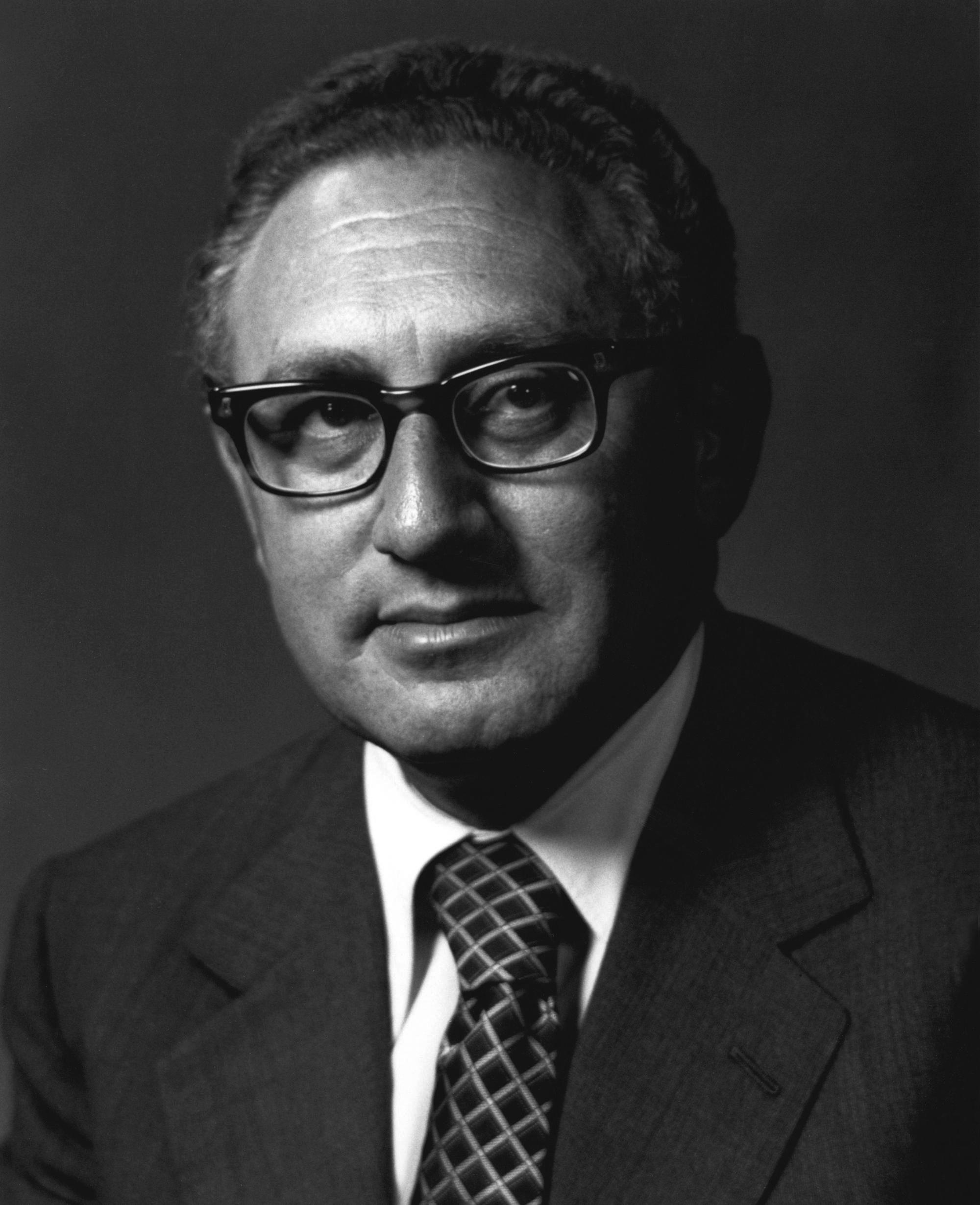
Henry Kissinger (1923–2023)

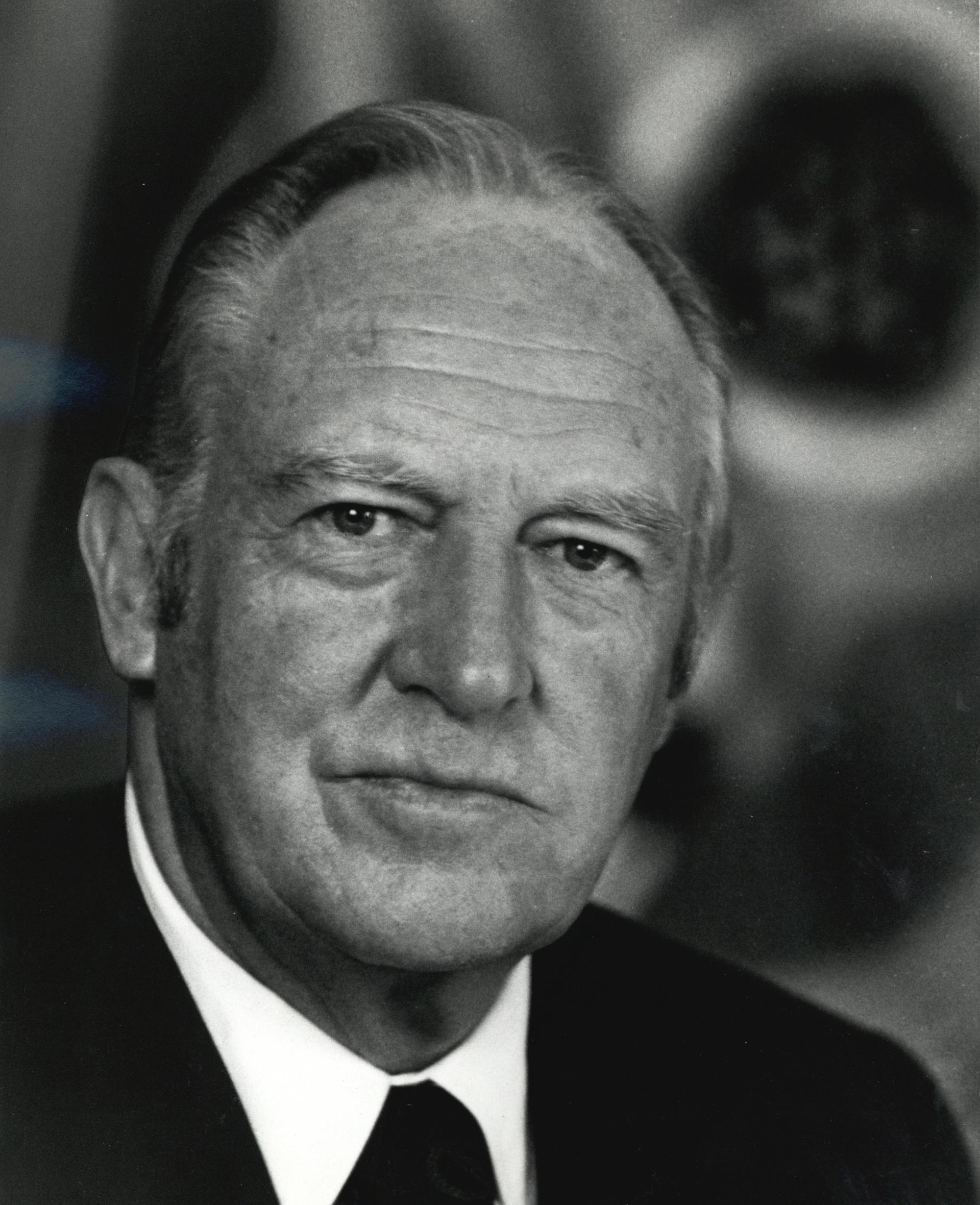
William P. Rogers (1913–2001)

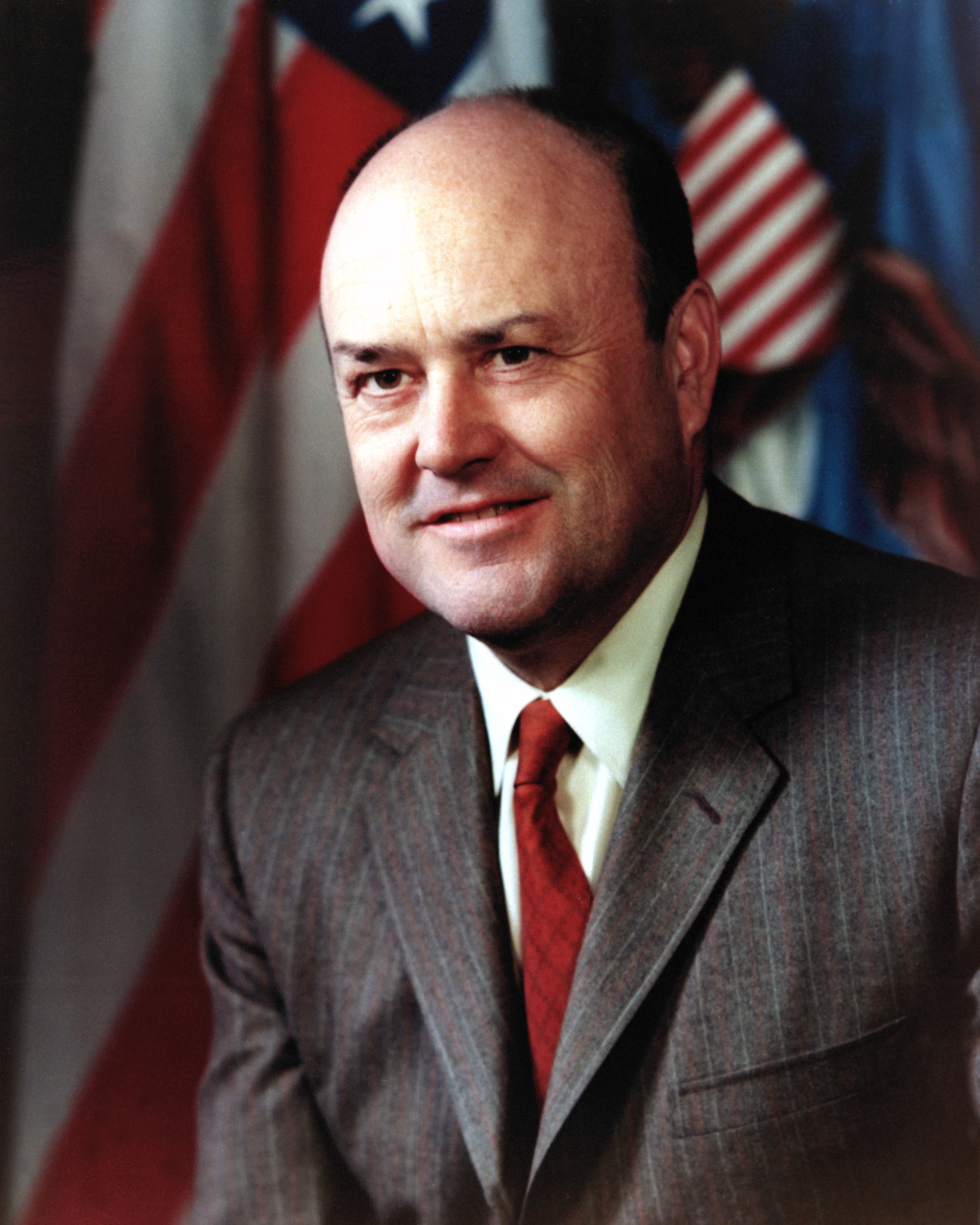
Melvin Laird (1922–2016)

President Richard Nixon and his top aide Henry Kissinger focused on the Soviet Union, China, Vietnam, the Middle East, Pakistan, and major arms limitation agreements. Unless a crisis erupted on other matters, they let the State Department handle it with secretary William P. Rogers in charge. He was an old friend of Nixon—a good administrator with little diplomatic experience and less interest in geopolitical dynamics.

=== Kissinger ===
The relationship between Nixon and Kissinger was unusually close, and has been compared to the relationships of Woodrow Wilson and Edward M. House, or Franklin D. Roosevelt and Harry Hopkins. In all three cases, State Department was relegated to a backseat role in developing foreign-policy. Historian David Rothkopf has compared the personalities of Nixon and Kissinger:

They were a fascinating pair. In a way, they complemented each other perfectly. Kissinger was the charming and worldly Mr. Outside who provided the grace and intellectual-establishment respectability that Nixon lacked, disdained and aspired to. Kissinger was an international citizen. Nixon very much a classic American. Kissinger had a worldview and a facility for adjusting it to meet the times, Nixon had pragmatism and a strategic vision that provided the foundations for their policies. Kissinger would, of course, say that he was not political like Nixon—but in fact he was just as political as Nixon, just as calculating, just as relentlessly ambitious....these self-made men were driven as much by their need for approval and their neuroses as by their strengths.

Kissinger who was the last surviving member of the foreign policy team and Nixon cabinet died in November 2023, Nixon himself having died in April 1994.

=== The Nixon Doctrine ===
The Nixon Doctrine shifted the main responsibility for the defense of an ally to the ally itself, especially regarding combat. The United States would work on the diplomacy, provide financial help and munitions, and help train the allied army. Specifically:

- The U.S. would keep all its treaty commitments.
- The U.S. would “provide a shield if a nuclear power threatens the freedom of a nation allied with us or of a nation whose survival we consider vital to our security.”
- In conflicts involving non-nuclear aggression, the U.S. would “look to the nation directly threatened to assume the primary responsibility of providing the manpower for defense.”

The Doctrine was exemplified by the Vietnamization process regarding South Vietnam and the Vietnam War. It also came into play elsewhere in Asia including Iran, Taiwan, Cambodia and South Korea. The doctrine was an explicit rejection of the practice that sent 500,000 United States Armed Forces soldiers to Vietnam, even though there was no treaty obligation to that country. A major long-term goal was to reduce the tension between the United States and the Soviet Union and China, so as to better enable the détente process to work.

== Détente and Arms Control, 1969–1979 ==
Nixon and Kissinger were both committed to a realism that focused on American economic advantages and jettisoned moralism in foreign policy, seeking détente with Communism and confrontation with old allies who now had become economic adversaries. Everyone assumed, mistakenly, that Nixon's anticommunist reputation at home indicated a hard-line cold warrior. But as early as 1959 (in his "kitchen debate" with Soviet leader Nikita Khrushchev), he was moving away from containment. Nixon concluded that containment (which he saw as a Truman policy) had failed. As a realist in foreign policy, it was time to emphasize economic goals in foreign policy, and to de-emphasize expensive ideological or peripheral commitments. Furthermore, having rich allies meant the American economy no longer could dominate or control the world economy. By the mid-1960s, China and the USSR had become bitter enemies. Their armies growled at one another across a long border; the risk of war was serious.

Both Moscow and Beijing realized it would be wise to de-escalate tensions with the US, but the Johnson administration had ignored them both. Sensing fresh opportunity, Nixon played the two Communist giants one against the other. Nixon's utterly unexpected trip to China in 1972 was set up by Kissinger's negotiations using Pakistan as an intermediary. The trip in effect ended the cold war with that nation and ushered in an era of friendship that was still unfolding a half-century later. Moscow rushed to catch favor, and Nixon's summit meetings with Leonid Brezhnev produced major arms agreements—especially a treaty banning anti-missile defenses in space; it was thought that the balance of terror, with each side having thousands of nuclear missiles, guaranteed peace, and that a successful defense against missiles would dangerously destabilize this equilibrium.

=== SALT I Agreements, 1969–72 ===
The Strategic Arms Limitation Talks (SALT) led to START I and START II, which were Strategic Arms Reduction Treaties with the USSR. The goal was to limit multiple independently targetable reentry vehicle capacities and impose other restrictions on each side's number of nuclear weapons. Thanks to negotiations in Helsinki, Finland, in November 1969, SALT I produced an Anti-Ballistic Missile Treaty and an interim agreement between the two countries. The agreement expired on December 31, 1985 and was not renewed. START never was ratified. A successor to START I, New START, was proposed and was eventually ratified in February 2011.

Nixon and Kissinger achieved breakthrough agreements with Moscow on the limitation of Anti Ballistic Missiles and the Interim Agreement on Strategic Missiles. Nixon was proud that he achieved an agreement that his predecessors were unable to reach, thanks to his diplomatic skills. Nixon and Kissinger planned to link arms control to détente and to the resolution of other urgent problems regarding Vietnam, the Mideast, and Berlin through the employment of linkage. The linkages never worked out because of flawed assumptions about Soviet plans.

=== Helsinki Final Act, 1975 ===
Nixon and Kissinger set up the international "Conference on Security and Cooperation in Europe" (CSCE) in Helsinki, bringing together nearly all of Europe in 1973. Washington's goal was to strengthen relations with the Soviet Union through détente. However, there was opposition at home from Ronald Reagan and the conservatives, and Gerald Ford's weak defense of the Accords hurt his reelection chances in the 1976 United States presidential election. The 1975 accords were signed by all of Europe, the USSR, the US and Canada. The key provisions included legitimizing the current borders, and a pledge by each nation to respect the human rights and civic freedoms of their own citizens. For the first time the USSR recognized its own people had rights regarding free speech and travel.

== China ==
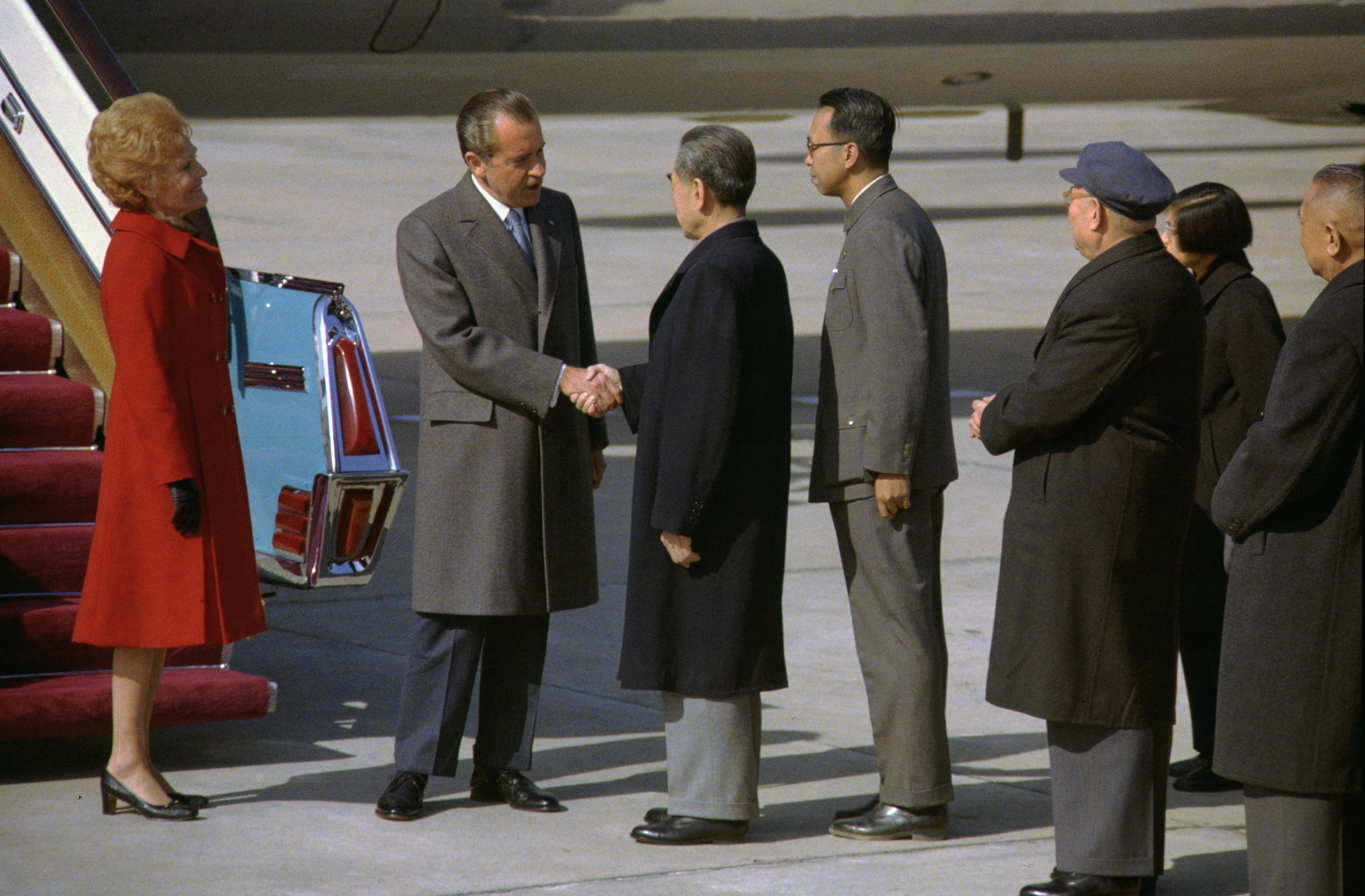
President Nixon shakes hands with Chinese Premier Zhou Enlai upon arriving in Beijing

After the end of the Chinese Civil War, the United States refused to formally recognize the People's Republic of China (PRC) as the legitimate government of China. Instead, the U.S. supported the Republic of China (ROC), which controlled Taiwan. By the time Nixon took office, many leading policy figures in the United States had come to believe the country should end its policy of isolating the PRC. The Chinese population presented American businesses with a large untapped market, and the Sino-Soviet split gave the United States an opportunity to play the two communist powers against each other. Chinese leaders, meanwhile, were receptive to closer relations with the U.S. for several reasons, including hostility to the Soviet Union, a desire for increased trade, and hopes of winning international recognition. Nixon personally sought closer relations with China (and the Soviet Union) as part of his larger strategy to end the Vietnam War on more accommodating terms, which he articulated in the following way:

I had long believed that an indispensable element of any successful peace initiative in Vietnam was to enlist, if possible, the help of the Soviets and the Chinese. Though rapprochement with China and détente with the Soviet Union were ends in themselves, I also considered them possible means to hasten the end of the war. At worst, Hanoi was bound to feel less confident if Washington was dealing with Moscow and Beijing. At best, if the two major Communist powers decided that they had bigger fish to fry, Hanoi would be pressured into negotiating a settlement we could accept.

Both sides faced domestic pressures against rapproachment. A conservative faction of the Republican Party led by Barry Goldwater and Ronald Reagan strongly opposed the policy, while Vice Chairman Lin Biao led a similar faction of the Chinese Communist Party. For the first two years of his presidency, Nixon and China each made subtle moves designed to lower tensions, including the removal of travel restrictions. The expansion of the Vietnam War into Laos and Cambodia hindered, but did not derail, the move towards normalization of relations. Due to a misunderstanding at the 1971 World Table Tennis Championships, the Chinese table tennis team invited the U.S. table tennis team to tour China. In the aftermath of the visit, Nixon lifted America's trade embargo on China. At a July 1971 meeting with Chinese Premier Zhou Enlai, Kissinger promised not to support independence for Taiwan, while Zhou invited Nixon to China for further talks. After the meeting, both countries announcing that Nixon would visit China in February 1972. In the aftermath of the announcement, the United Nations passed Resolution 2758, which transferred recognition from the ROC to the PRC as the sole and legitimate representative of China, and expelled the ROC from the assembly.

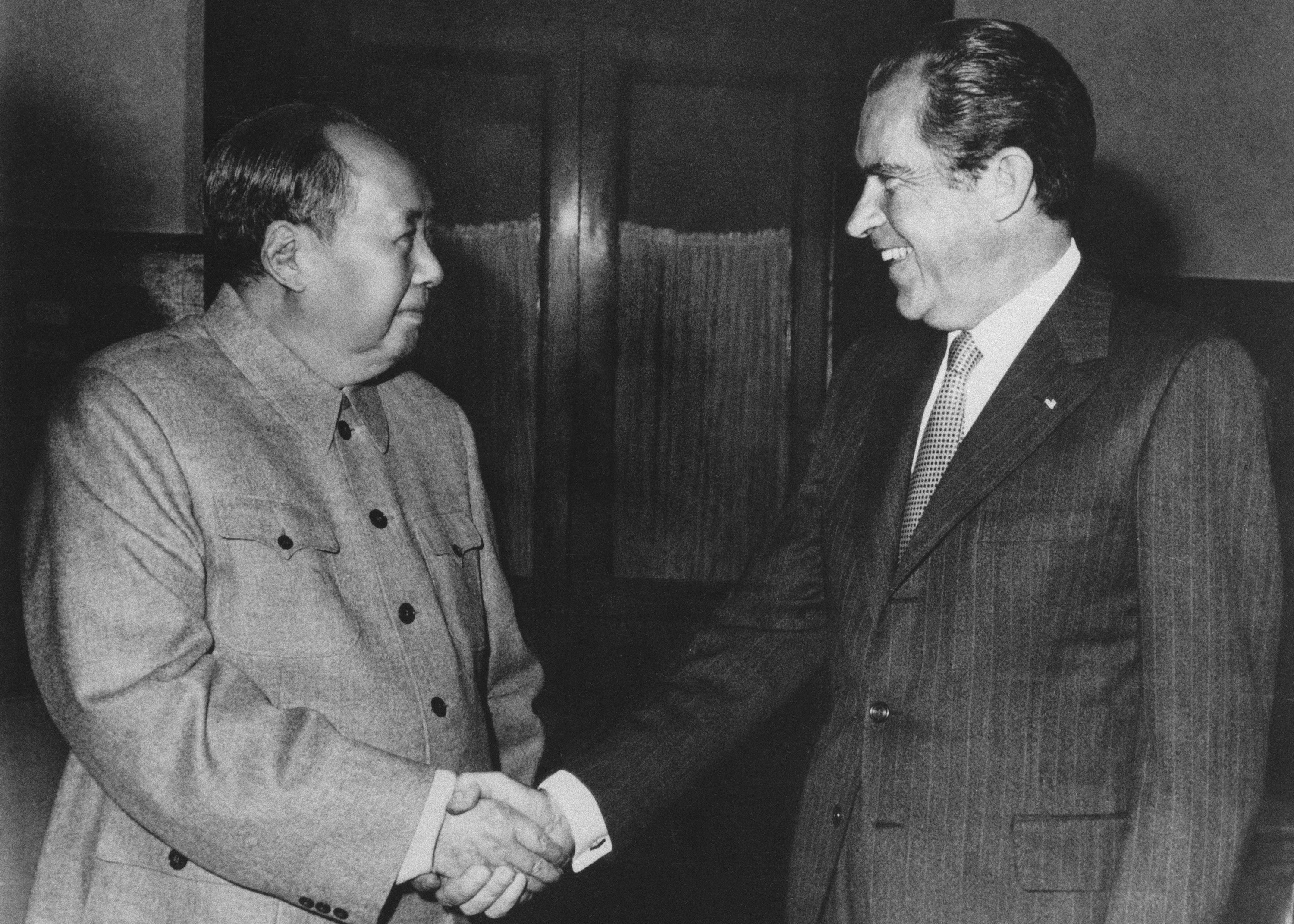
Chinese Communist Party Chairman Mao Zedong meets with Nixon, 1972

In February 1972, Nixon traveled to China; Kissinger briefed Nixon for over 40 hours in preparation. Upon touching down in the Chinese capital of Beijing, the President and First Lady emerged from Air Force One and greeted Zhou. Nixon made a point of shaking Zhou's hand, something which then-Secretary of State John Foster Dulles had refused to do in 1954 when the two met at the Geneva Conference. Prior to the meeting, the Nixon administration convinced Chinese leaders to allow the construction of a satellite relay station, which enabled Nixon's visit to be broadcast live in the U.S. The visit was carefully choreographed by both governments, and major events took place during prime time to reach the widest possible television audience in the U.S. When not in meetings, Nixon toured architectural landmarks including the Forbidden City, Ming Tombs, and the Great Wall. Americans received their first glimpse into Chinese life through the cameras which accompanied Pat Nixon, who toured the city of Beijing and visited communes, schools, factories, and hospitals.

Nixon and Kissinger discussed a range of issues with Zhou and Mao Zedong, the Chairman of the Chinese Communist Party. China provided assurances that it would not intervene in the Vietnam War, while the United States promised to prevent Japan from acquiring nuclear weapons. Nixon acknowledged China's claim to Taiwan, while the Chinese agreed to pursue a peaceful settlement in the Cross-Strait dispute with the ROC. The United States and China increased trade relations and established unofficial embassies in each other's respective capitals. Though some conservatives criticized his visit, Nixon's opening of relations with China was widely popular in the United States. The visit also aided Nixon's negotiations with the Soviet Union, which feared the possibility of an alliance between the United States and the PRC.

== Vietnam ==
At the time Nixon took office, there were over 500,000 American soldiers in Southeast Asia. Over 30,000 U.S. military personnel serving in the Vietnam War had been killed since 1961, with approximately half of those deaths occurring in 1968. The war was broadly unpopular in the United States, with widespread, sometimes violent protests taking place on a regular basis. The Johnson administration had agreed to suspend bombing in exchange for negotiations without preconditions, but this agreement never fully took force. According to Walter Isaacson, soon after taking office, Nixon had concluded that the Vietnam War could not be won and he was determined to end the war quickly. Conversely, Black argues that Nixon sincerely believed he could intimidate North Vietnam through the Madman theory. Regardless of his opinion of the war, Nixon wanted to end the American role in it without the appearance of an American defeat, which he feared would badly damage his presidency and precipitate a return to isolationism. He sought some arrangement which would permit American forces to withdraw, while leaving South Vietnam secure against attack.

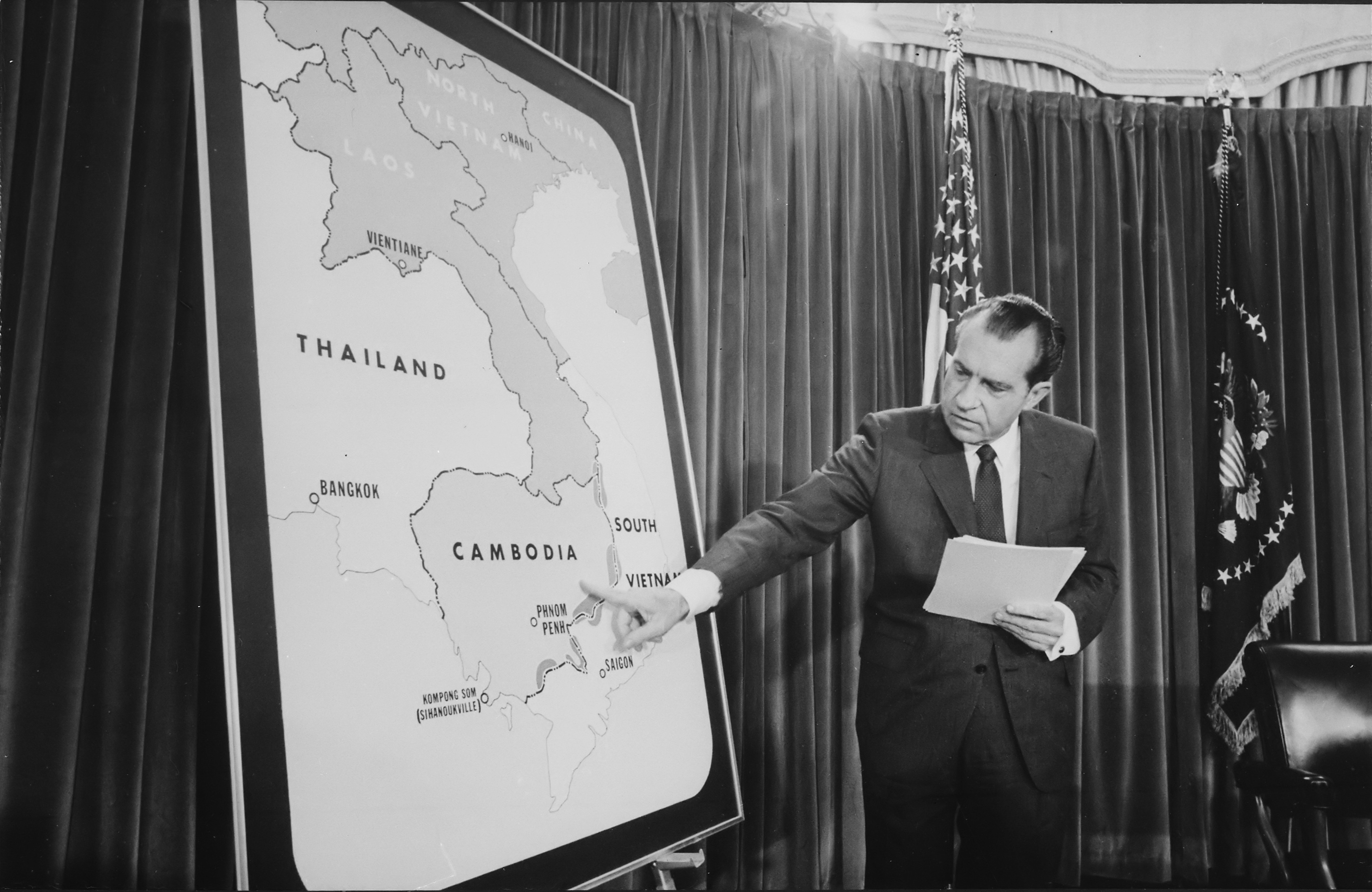
Nixon delivers an address to the nation about the bombings in Cambodia, April 30, 1970

In mid-1969, Nixon began efforts to negotiate peace with the North Vietnamese, but negotiators were unable to reach an agreement. With the failure of the peace talks, Nixon implemented a strategy of "Vietnamization," which consisted of increased U.S. aid and Army of the Republic of Vietnam (ARVN) troops taking on a greater combat role in the war. To great public approval, he began phased troop withdrawals by the end of 1969, sapping the strength of the domestic anti-war movement. Despite the failure of Operation Lam Son 719, which was designed to be the first major test of the ARVN since the implementation of Vietnamization, the drawdown of American soldiers in Vietnam continued throughout Nixon's tenure.

=== Vietnamization ===
==== 1971 ====
During the year 1971 that saw the removal of nearly all American ground forces, Hanoi was building up forces for a full-scale invasion of the South. In late March 1972, the People's Army of Vietnam (PAVN) launched a major cross-border conventional surprise attack on the South. They expected the peasants to rise up and overthrow the government; they did not. They expected the South's army to collapse; instead the ARVN fought very well indeed. They did not expect heavy US bombing, which disrupted their plans.

In 1971 Nixon sent massive quantities of hardware to the ARVN, and gave Thieu a personal pledge to send air power if Hanoi invaded. The year 1971 was eerily quiet, with no large campaigns, apart from a big U.S.-backed ARVN foray into Laos to which was routed by the PAVN. All U.S. ground troops had been withdrawn by 1972 because of constant failures and casualties. The guerrilla warfare had been won by the PAVN and VC.

==== 1972: LINEBACKER I ====
North Vietnamese commander Võ Nguyên Giáp decided that since the American forces had left he could invade in conventional fashion and defeat Saigon's demoralized army, the ARVN. His assumption that Vietnamization had failed was soon proven wrong. Saigon had started to exert itself; new draft laws produced over one million well-armed regular soldiers, and another four million in part-time, lightly armed self-defense militia.

In March–April, 1972 Hanoi invaded at three points from north and west with PAVN regulars spearheaded by tanks. On March 30, 30,000 PAVN troops, supported by regiments of tanks and artillery, rolled southward across the Vietnamese Demilitarized Zone (DMZ) that separated the two Vietnams. A second PAVN force of 20,000 crossed the border from their sanctuaries in Cambodia into areas north of Saigon. A third PAVN invasion moved in from eastern Laos. This was conventional old- fashioned warfare, reminiscent of North Korea's invasion of South Korea in 1950.

The outcome was quite different however. Nixon ordered LINEBACKER I, with 42,000 bombing sorties over North Vietnam. Hanoi was evacuated. Nixon also ordered the mining of North Vietnam's harbors, a stroke LBJ had always vetoed for fear of Soviet or Chinese involvement, But thanks to détente the Soviets and Chinese held quiet. The ARVN, its morale stiffened by American resolve, rose to the occasion. With massive tactical air support from the US, it held the line. However, the American forces suffered serious losses during the operation. As in Tet, the peasants refused to rise up against the GVN. "By God, the South Vietnamese can hack it!" exclaimed a pleasantly surprised General Creighton Abrams. Since the PAVN's conventional forces required continuous resupply in large quantities, the air campaign broke the back of the invasion and the PAVN forces were stopped. However they did maintain control of a slice of territory south of the DMZ. There the NLF, renamed the "Provisional Revolutionary Government of South Vietnam" (PRG) was established; it welcomed diplomats from the Communist world, including Castroist Cuba, and served as one of the launch points of the 1975 invasion.

After the Easter Offensive the government of Nguyễn Văn Thiệu made a fatal strategic mistake. Overconfident of its military prowess, it adopted a policy of static defense that made its units vulnerable; worse, it failed to use the breathing space to reorganize and rebuilt its faulty command structure. The departure of American forces and American money lowered morale in both military and civilian South Vietnam. Desertions rose as military performance indicators sank, and no longer was the US looking over the shoulder demanding improvement. Politics, not military need, still ruled the South Vietnamese Army. On other side, the PAVN had been badly mauled—the difference was that it knew it and it was determined to rebuild. Discarding guerrilla tactics, Giap three years to rebuild his forces into a strong conventional army. Without constant American bombing it was possible to solve the logistics problem by modernizing the Ho Chi Minh trail with 12,000 more miles of roads. Brazenly, he even constructed a pipeline along the Trail to bring in gasoline for the next invasion.

==== Linebacker II 1972 ====
Late in 1972 election peace negotiations bogged down; Thieu demanded concrete evidence of Nixon's promises to Saigon. Nixon thereupon unleashed the full fury of air power to force Hanoi to come to terms. Operation LINEBACKER II, in 12 days smashed many targets in North Vietnam cities that had always been sacrosanct. US policy was to try to avoid residential areas; the North Vietnamese Politburo had already evacuated civilians not engaged in essential war work. The Soviets had sold Hanoi 1,200 surface-to-air missiles that proved effective against the B-52s. 34 strategic bombers have been destroyed or damaged. An American negotiator in Paris observed that:

Prior to LINEBACKER II, the North Vietnamese were intransigent. After LINEBACKER II, they were shaken, demoralized, and anxious to talk about anything. Beijing and Moscow advised Hanoi to agree to the Paris Peace Accords; they did so on January 23, 1973. The United States Air Force interpreted the quick settlement as proof unrestricted bombing of the sort they had wanted to do for eight years had finally broken Hanoi's will to fight; other analysts said Hanoi had not changed at all. In Paris, the North Vietnamese refused to change the terms they had agreed to in the October 1972 agreement.

=== Bombing of Cambodia, 1969 ===
In March 1969, Nixon approved a secret B-52 carpet bombing campaign (code-named Operation Menu) of North Vietnamese positions in Cambodia without the consent of Cambodian leader Norodom Sihanouk. In early 1970, Nixon sent U.S. and South Vietnamese soldiers into Cambodia to attack North Vietnamese bases, expanding the ground war out of Vietnam for the first time. Even within the administration, many disapproved of the incursions into Cambodia, and anti-war protesters were irate. The bombing of Cambodia continued into the 1970s in support of the Cambodian government of Lon Nol—which was then battling a Khmer Rouge insurgency in the Cambodian Civil War—as part of Operation Freedom Deal.

=== Ending the Vietnam War, 1973–1974 ===
In the aftermath of the Easter Offensive, peace talks between the United States and North Vietnam resumed, and by October 1972 a framework for a settlement had been reached. Objections from South Vietnamese President Nguyễn Văn Thiệu derailed this agreement, and the peace talks broke down. After years of fighting, the Paris Peace Accords were signed at the beginning of 1973. The agreement implemented a cease fire and allowed for the withdrawal of remaining American troops; however, it did not require the 160,000 North Vietnam Army regulars located in the South to withdraw. By March 1973, U.S. military forces had been withdrawn from Vietnam. Once American combat support ended, there was a brief truce, but fighting quickly broke out again, as both South Vietnam and North Vietnam violated the truce. Congress effectively ended any possibility of another American military intervention by passing the War Powers Resolution over Nixon's veto.

== Bangladesh, India and Pakistan ==
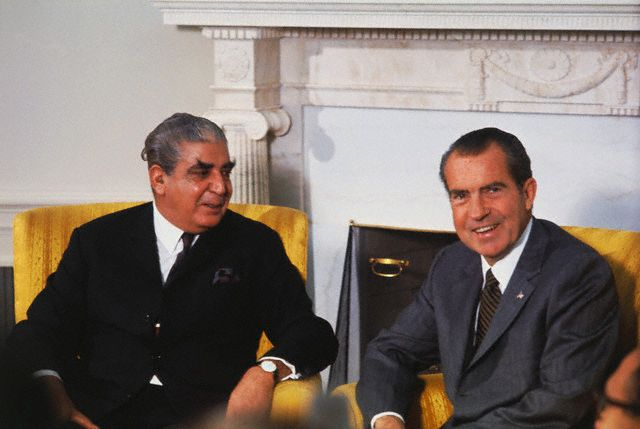
Nixon with Pakistani president Yahya Khan at the White House

In March 1971, the Bangladesh Liberation War broke out in East Pakistan between Bengali nationalists and the Pakistani military government of Yahya Khan. Nixon supported Pakistan against Bengali separatists and their ally India. Nixon sent the Task Force 74 carrier group to the Bay of Bengal to weigh in on Pakistan's side but without any combat action. Nixon and Kissinger saw India as a threat to U.S. interests, yet they were constrained by their belief that the American public would not accept hostilities against a fellow democracy. Pakistan was needed to facilitate secret talks underway with China that led to a revolutionary rapprochement turning China from enemy to friend. Nixon feared that an Indian invasion of West Pakistan would risk total Soviet domination of the region, and that it would seriously undermine the global position of the United States and the regional position of America's new tacit ally, China. In direct violation of the U.S. Congress-imposed sanctions on Pakistan, Nixon covertly sent military supplies to Pakistan through Iran and Jordan. However the war ended in a Pakistani defeat and Bangladesh became a sovereign country. India resented the American role for decades.

Later in 1974, India conducted its first nuclear test, Smiling Buddha, which was opposed by the US. However, the US concluded that the test did not violate any agreement and proceeded with a June 1974 shipment of enriched uranium for the Tarapur reactor.

== Japan ==
When Nixon first took office, Japanese prime minister Eisaku Satō undertook an all-out charm offensive to convince Nixon to authorize the return of Okinawa to Japanese control. Satō's efforts bore fruit when he visited Washington at Nixon's invitation in November 1969, and in a joint communiqué signed by the two leaders, Nixon announced the United States had agreed to return Okinawa to Japan by 1972. However, the price of this concession was Satō's staunch support of the ongoing Vietnam War and the U.S. policy of no official relations with Communist China. Satō also showed his loyalty to the U.S. by allowing the U.S.-Japan Security Treaty to automatically renew in 1970, thus putting a damper on any attempt to repeat of the 1960 Anpo protests.

Satō's firm endorsement of the security treaty and the long-awaited settlement of the Okinawa reversion question meant that two major points of contention in U.S.-Japan relations were eliminated. But new issues arose following the so-called "Nixon Shocks" of 1971. In July 1971, the Japanese government was stunned by Nixon's dramatic announcement of his forthcoming visit to the People's Republic of China. Many Japanese were chagrined by the failure of the United States to consult in advance with Japan before making such a fundamental change in foreign policy, and the sudden change in America's stance made Prime Minister Satō's staunch adherence to non-relations with China look like he had been played for a fool. The following month, the government was again surprised to learn that, without prior consultation, Nixon was imposing a 10 percent surcharge on imports, a decision explicitly aimed at hindering Japan's exports to the United States, and was unilaterally suspending the convertibility of dollars into gold, which would eventually lead to the collapse of the Bretton Woods system of fixed currency exchange rates. The resulting decoupling of the Japanese yen and the dollar led the yen to soar in value, significantly damaging Japan's international trade and economic outlook.

These shocks of 1971 marked the beginning of a new stage in relations. The basic relationship remained close, but frictions increasingly appeared as Japan's economic growth led to economic rivalry. The political issues between the two countries were essentially security-related and derived from efforts by the United States to induce Japan to contribute more to its own defense and to regional security. The economic issues tended to stem from the ever-widening United States trade and payments deficits with Japan, which began in 1965 when Japan reversed its imbalance in trade with the United States and, for the first time, achieved an export surplus.

A second round of shocks began in 1973 when the oil producing states of OPEC introduced a worldwide oil embargo to protest Israeli policies in the Middle East, leading to a worldwide oil crisis. Japan had rapidly transitioned its economy and industry from coal to a high dependence on oil in the postwar period, and was hit hard by the first oil shock in 1973 and again by the second oil shock attending the Iranian Revolution in 1979. Japan further attracted American ire by renouncing support for Israel and U.S. policy in the Middle East in order to secure early relief from the embargo.

== Africa ==
=== Nigeria and Biafra, 1967–1970 ===
Nigeria experienced a devastating six-year civil war during the 1960s and early 1970s. It defeated the breakaway attempt by Biafra, the richest province. US-Nigerian relations were strained under Nixon, who seemed to favor Biafra but in the end formally supported the national government. The two nations began friendly trade and political ties beginning in 1977 starting with a visit by President Carter.

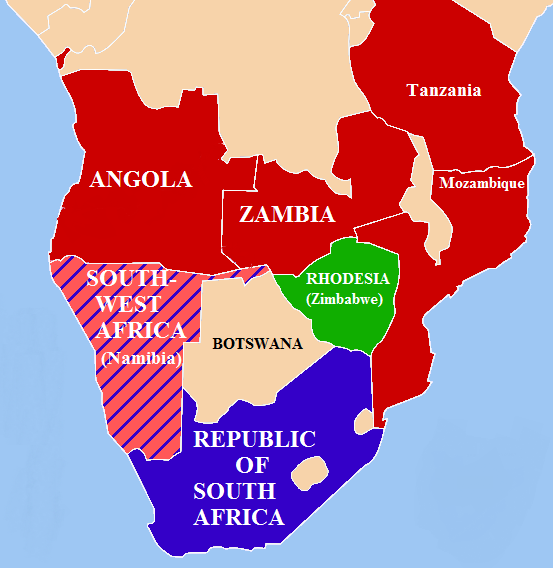
Geopolitical situation, 1978–79. SWAPO allies South African allies South West Africa (Namibia) South Africa

=== Angola, 1974–75 ===
Nixon continued policies of Kennedy and Johnson regarding the anti-colonial struggle that began in 1961 in Angola and continued until the coup d'état. The Soviet-backed faction defeated the UNITA faction supported by the U.S. and South Africa.

=== Zaire ===
Nixon maintained friendly relations with dictator Mobutu Sese Seko, who was critical in the Nixon Doctrine in Africa. Nixon first met Mobutu in a visit to the country in 1967 where he praised him as having "drive and vitality". Nixon was interested in Zaire for geostrategic and economic reasons. Nixon invited Mobutu to the White House who arrived in August 1970, making him the first African head of state to visit America under Nixon.

== Middle East ==
=== Egypt ===
Sadat asked Moscow for help, and Washington responded by offering more favorable financial aid and technology to Anwar Sadat of Egypt; as a result the Soviets were forced out of Egypt in 1971. The advantages included Egypt's expulsion of 20,000 Soviet advisors and the reopening of the Suez Canal, and were seen by Nixon and Kissinger as "an investment in peace." Also in the region Saudi Arabia and the United States had a common interest in weakening the radical Arab states of Libya, Iraq, and South Yemen, and the militant PLO (Palestine Liberation Organization). The effect was to reduce Soviet influence in the region, generally.

=== Arab-Israeli (Yom Kippur) War, 1973 ===
In October 1973, Syria and Egypt attacked Israel in order to regain territories they had lost in the Six-Day War of 1967. It was a complete surprise to Israel and then U.S. Secretary of State Henry Kissinger rushed to Moscow to restrain the Soviets. The U.S. airlifted $2 billion in military supplies to Israel, contributing to its victory against Syria and multiple battles against Egypt. The US helped to arrange an uneasy cease-fire.

=== Arab Oil Embargo, 1973–1974 ===
As the Yom Kippur war ended in defeat, the oil-producing Arab nations, organized as the Organization of Arab Petroleum Exporting Countries, embargoed oil shipments to US and Israel's supporters, causing a worldwide energy crisis and severe damage to the world economy as fuel prices rose dramatically commensurate to the sharp decline in supply. By 1970, the United States economy was heavily dependent on oil for cars, trucks and heating; domestic production had peaked in 1970 and more and more was imported. Fuel efficiency and new supplies were urgently needed so Congress approved the Trans-Alaska Pipeline System to reach the oil fields in far northern Alaska and imposed a national speed limit of 55 mph.

=== Kissinger's "Shuttle Diplomacy" 1973–74 ===
See

=== Iran and the Shah ===
A major development was the overthrow of the Shah of Iran in 1978–79 and the emergence of the Islamic Republic of Iran as an anti-American regime. James Bill and other historians have said that between 1969 and 1974 Nixon and Kissinger actively recruited the Shah as an American puppet and proxy. However, Richard Alvandi argues that it worked the other war around, with the Shah taking the initiative. President Nixon, who had first met the Shah in 1953, regarded him as a modernizing anticommunist statesman who deserved American support now that the British were withdrawing from the region. They met in 1972 and the Shah agreed to buy large quantities of expensive American military hardware and took responsibility for ensuring political stability and fighting off Soviet subversion throughout the region.

== Latin America ==
=== Cuba ===
“I was hard-line on Cuba,” Nixon told Jules Witcover in 1966. He said that if he won the 1960 election, he would have pressured Eisenhower to send the exiles into combat before his inauguration on January 20, 1961.

=== Chile ===
Chile moved sharply to the left, after 1970, seizing American copper mining companies and aligning itself with Castro's Cuba. In 1973 the Chilean Armed Forces under Augusto Pinochet executed a coup d'état that overthrew the socialist government of Salvador Allende, and killed him. Nixon and Kissinger set policy to strongly oppose the Allende regime while avoiding visible intervention. Economic pressure was used to boycott Chilean copper and thereby damage the Chilean economy and retaliate for nationalizing American copper interests without compensation. Following Allende's election Nixon declared that he wanted to "make the economy scream". The CIA convinced the Chilean generals that Allende was plotting against the army. The result of the coup was long term authoritarian control of Chile by General Augusto Pinochet who supported American interests and brutally crushed the left wing opposition.

For decades historians have heatedly debated the role of the United States, focusing on four main issues: (1) Did the US attempt to spark a military coup to prevent Salvador Allende taking office in 1970? (There was no coup that year.) (2) The commander in chief of the Chilean Armed Forces, General Rene Schneider blocked coup efforts; he was murdered—was the US involved? (3) Chile's economy went into free fall as copper revenues plunged and food prices soared; was the US responsible? (4) Was the US involved in the plotting and execution of the successful 1973 coup? The Clinton Administration in 1999–2000 released a massive cache of 23,000 secret documents, allowing for the first time an in-depth look at American involvement. Historians working through the documents continue to be bitterly divided, with one group insisting that American involvement at all stages was minimal, and the opposition insisting that Kissinger was deeply guilty.

=== Honduras ===
On November 22, 1971, the United States handed over the Swan Islands to Honduras after signing the Treaty of the Swan Islands. Honduras began exercising this sovereignty on September 1, 1972.

== Canada ==
Nixon personally despised Canadian Prime Minister Pierre Trudeau, and the two clashed over Trudeau's independent foreign policy.

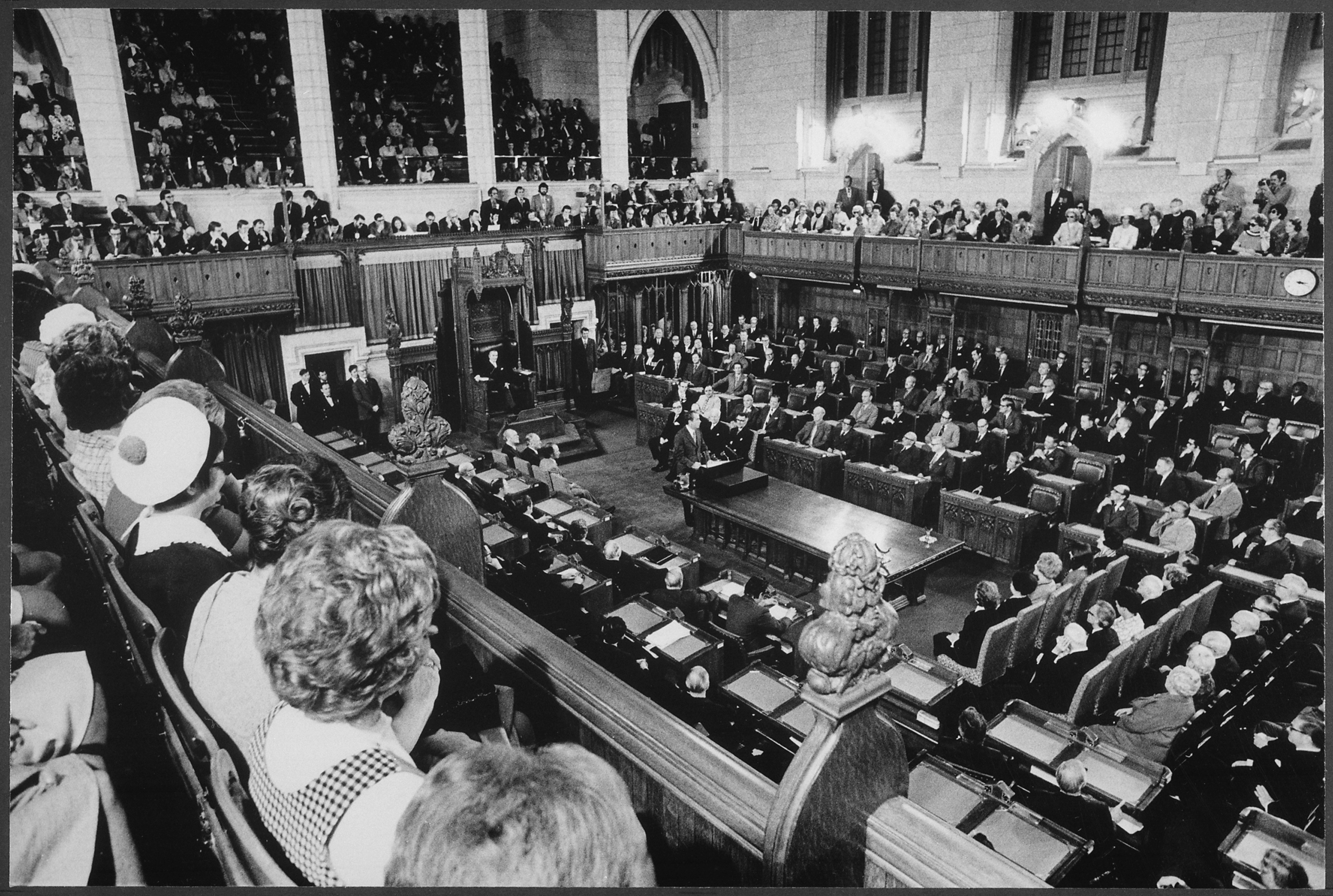
President Nixon addresses the Parliament of Canada, 1972

The United States was by far Canada's largest market. The Canadian economy became dependent on smooth trade flows with the United States so much that in 1971 when the United States enacted the "Nixon Shock" economic policies (including a 10% tariff on all imports) it put the Canadian government into a panic. Canada reacted by introducing an Employment Support Program, stepping up the tempo of discussions on trade matters, and meeting with international bodies. Trudeau promoted his "Third Option" policy of diversifying Canada's trade and downgrading the importance of Canada – United States relations. In a 1972 speech in Ottawa, Nixon declared the "special relationship" between Canada and the United States dead.

Relations deteriorated on many points, including trade disputes, defense agreements, energy, fishing, the environment, cultural imperialism, and foreign policy. They changed for the better when Trudeau and President Jimmy Carter (1977–1981) found a better rapport.

== The Nixon shock to international finance ==
The administration made drastic changes in international finance with its 1971 New Economic Policy and again with a second devaluation of the United States dollar in February 1973. The result was the end of fixed exchange rates that set the value of the dollar in terms of gold; it had been well established since Bretton Woods in 1944. Nixon and his powerful Secretary of the Treasury John Connally juggled international versus domestic forces, as well as military-political needs. Especially concerning was continuing inflation in the U.S., increasing unemployment, and a growing trade deficit. Major effects included an 8% devaluation of the dollar, as well as new surcharges on imports, and unexpected controls on wages and prices that had never been used except in wartime. One result was to loosen restraints on the fast-growing economy of West Germany, freeing it to dominate the European economy. However the United Kingdom suffered, as the free-floating pound meant that sterling lost its role as a reserve currency.

== See also ==
- Foreign policy of the Gerald Ford administration
- Henry Kissinger
- Presidency of Richard Nixon
- Richard Nixon

== Sources ==
- Ambrose, Stephen E. (1989). Nixon: The Triumph of a Politician 1962–1972. Vol. II. New York: Simon & Schuster. ISBN 978-0-671-72506-8.
- Ambrose, Stephen E. (1991). Nixon: Ruin and Recovery 1973–1990. Vol. III. New York: Simon & Schuster. ISBN 978-0-671-69188-2.
- Black, Conrad (2007). Richard M. Nixon: A Life in Full. New York: PublicAffairs Books. ISBN 978-1-58648-519-1.
- Dallek, Robert (2007). Nixon and Kissinger: Partners in Power. New York: HarperCollins. ISBN 978-0-06-072230-2.
- Drew, Elizabeth (2007). Richard M. Nixon. The American Presidents Series. New York: Times Books. ISBN 978-0-8050-6963-1.
- Gaddis, John Lewis (1982). Strategies of Containment: A Critical Appraisal of Postwar American National Security Policy. Oxford: Oxford University Press. ISBN 978-0-19-503097-6.
- Guan, Ang Cheng (2003). Ending the Vietnam War: The Vietnamese Communists' Perspective. Florence, Kentucky: RoutledgeCurzon. ISBN 978-0-415-40619-2.
- Herring, George C. (2008). From Colony to Superpower; U.S. Foreign Relations Since 1776. Oxford University Press. ISBN 978-0-19-507822-0.
- Kapur, Nick (2018). Japan at the Crossroads: Conflict and Compromise after Anpo. Cambridge, Massachusetts: Harvard University Press. ISBN 978-0674984424.
- Small, Melvin (1999). The Presidency of Richard Nixon. University Press of Kansas. ISBN 978-0-7006-0973-4.
- Zhai, Qiang (2000). China and the Vietnam Wars, 1950–1975. Chapel Hill, N.C.: University of North Carolina Press. ISBN 978-0-8078-4842-5.
