= Pactomania =

1940s–1950s US period of treaty-making

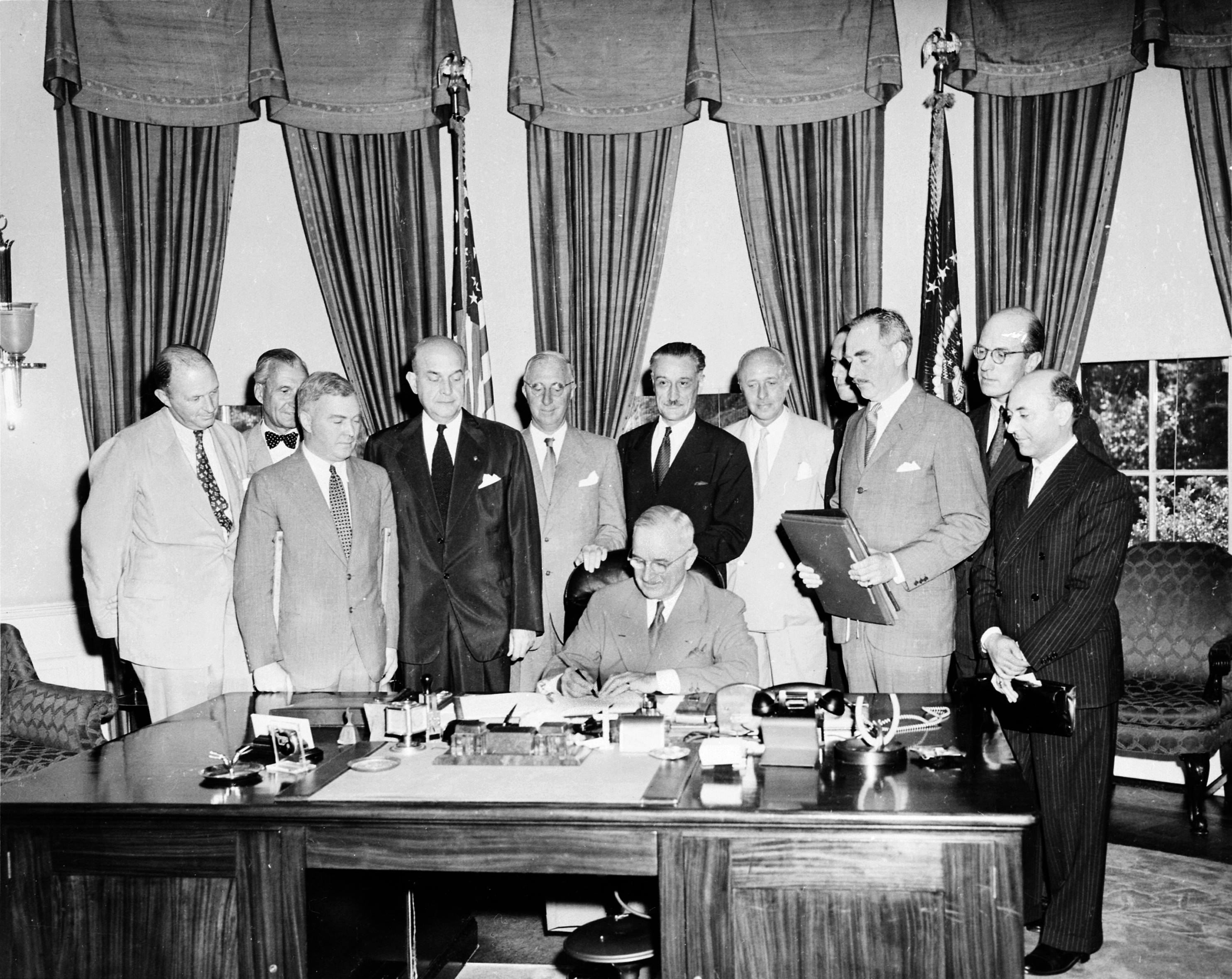
Harry Truman signing the North Atlantic Treaty, 1949

Pactomania is a term originally created to describe the period between 1945 and 1955, during which the United States concluded or ratified a significant amount of alliances, treaties, and pacts. The word "Pactomania" was first used in a The New York Times article in 1955.

Following World War II, the US abandoned its previous policy of isolationism and embraced internationalism, occupying Japan, southern Korea, and zones in Germany and Austria, hosting the new United Nations, International Monetary Fund, and World Bank, and establishing the US dollar as the world's reserve currency through the Bretton Woods system. In terms of defense, the US initially supported the idea of collective security by the five UN Security Council powers, with the US focused on the defense of its sphere of influence in the Western Hemisphere through the Organization of American States and the multilateral Rio Pact security alliance.

However, growing concerns over the Soviet Union's large military presence and installation of satellite states in Eastern Europe, espionage activities within the US, and the potential for the spread of communism in devastated Europe and decolonizing nations led to a shift in US foreign policy. The inability of the United Kingdom to manage these issues, as evidenced by the Greek Civil War and Turkish Straits crisis, prompted the US to become closely involved in Europe and adopt the Truman Doctrine of containing communism through Marshall Plan financial aid and the multilateral North Atlantic Treaty Organization (NATO) security alliance.

In Asia, the US initially focused on the Acheson Line or "defense perimeter", which did not prioritize China, Korea, or Taiwan. However, the fall of China to communism and the subsequent public outcry in the US led to a change in approach. The US became involved in the Korean War and established a system of bilateral security alliances along the western Pacific Rim, often referred to as the "hub-and-spoke system", including alliances with Japan, South Korea, Taiwan, and the Philippines, as well as Australia and New Zealand. Additionally, the multilateral Southeast Asia Treaty Organization (SEATO) security alliance was formed in Southeast Asia. The multilateral Middle East Treaty Organization (METO) security alliance, intended to fight communism in the Middle East, ended up never being joined by the United States due to "the pro-Israel lobby".

The alliances formed during Pactomania have played a pivotal role in the modern era, from the Vietnam War to the Russian invasion of Ukraine. Many of the alliances formed during Pactomania remain today, although SEATO, METO, and the US-Taiwan alliance have been dissolved. Despite the dissolution of SEATO, its underlying collective defense treaty remains in force, and forms the basis of the US-Thailand mutual security alliance. Similarly, in spite of the 1979 dissolution of the US-Taiwan alliance, the US retains significant military relations with Taiwan through the Taiwan Relations Act.

== End of isolationism ==
Prior to this bout of "Pactomania" the United States was described by historians as interventionist in the case of world affairs, but isolationist in the case of alliances. It is often argued by political scientists such as Bear Braumoeller that the US used other methods, particularly financial, to exert its influence over the world. Meanwhile, it avoided outside alliances, treaties, and pacts. Engaging with other countries' affairs was discouraged in George Washington's farewell address and the Monroe Doctrine. It had been followed in American foreign policy, with the exception of the world wars. As the Cold War divided the world into two, both the Soviet Union and the US sought to grow their alliances.

== John Foster Dulles ==
John Foster Dulles was the Secretary of State to President Dwight D. Eisenhower, and a senator for a brief period. Due to his values and experience from his career in law, he believed in the advantages of treaties to fight communist forces in the Cold War. He employed this strategy throughout his career such as in 1945, helping create the UN Charter, and in 1954, the Southeast Asia Treaty Organization (SEATO) and the Middle East Treaty Organization (METO). Dulles also proposed the creation of a Northeast Asia Treaty Organization (NEATO), which was shelved in favor of bilateral alliances with the concerned states. Before his death, he contributed to the creation of the Eisenhower Doctrine. Dulles demonstrated the importance of treaties to US foreign policy.

== Significant alliances and events ==
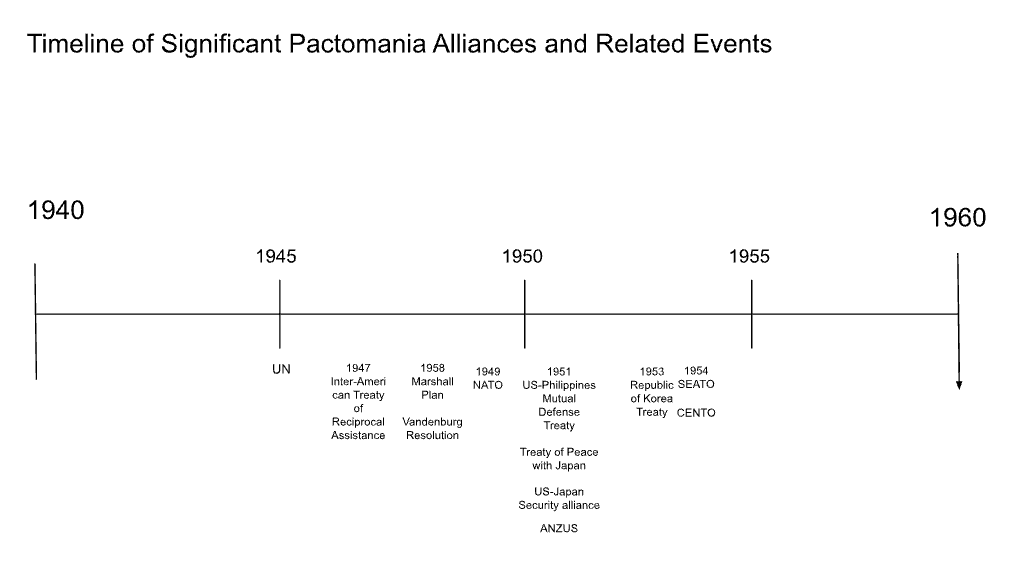

=== United Nations (1945) ===
One of the biggest alliances was the creation of the United Nations, an international organization created at the end of World War II, to promote peace and curtail war. It was made to replace the League of Nations. Former US President Woodrow Wilson helped found the League after the First World War, but it was never joined by the US.

President Franklin D. Roosevelt proposed the idea of the UN to Soviet Premier Joseph Stalin in November 1943. It was jointly discussed with and proposed by China, the USSR, the UK, and the US.

The Declaration of the United Nations was crafted in 1942 at the Arcadia Conference, but the organization was officially created with the signing of the UN Charter in 1945. Both of these events took place in US cities. At the time the UN was founded, US President Harry Truman's aim was to increase America's participation in international organizations, which is why it was one of the founding members, and the first country to ratify the Charter. Through the creation of the UN Charter, six smaller organizations, called "organs" were created to handle separate affairs:

- General Assembly
- Economic and Social Council
- Trusteeship council
- International Court of Justice
- Secretariat

=== Rio Pact (1947) ===
Rio Pact

The idea to create this treaty, also known as the Rio Treaty, had been discussed since the late 1930s when the leaders of the Americas met in several South American cities. However, the countries could not agree due to hesitance from the US and Uruguay. When Senator Vandenburg publicly espoused the idea in a 1947 speech, and the Senate accepted it, nations could sign the Treaty in Rio de Janeiro. Initially, there were 20 members to the Rio Treaty: Argentina, Bolivia, Brazil, Chile, Colombia, Costa Rica, Cuba, Dominican Republic, El Salvador, Guatemala, Haiti, Honduras, Mexico, Panama, Paraguay, Peru, United States, Uruguay, and Venezuela. In 1964, Cuba was suspended, due to its support of communism.

The purpose of the treaty was that in the event of an attack on a member, the other would be obliged to come to their defense, on request. Nowadays, aside from the occasional implementation, such as the US request for support after the 9/11 attacks, the treaty has fallen into disuse. The Rio Pact influenced the creation of the Vandenburg Resolution, and then, the North Atlantic Treaty Organization (NATO).

=== Marshall Plan (1948) ===
In the wake of World War II, several European countries were considered to be in shambles with their economies collapsed. Cities were not able to produce enough goods to trade with resource-producing areas and unable to feed their citizens. The Soviet Union took control of Eastern Europe, which threatened Western Europe.

The "Marshall Plan" was suggested by US Secretary of State George Marshall in 1947. The intention was for the US to provide financially for Europe to rebuild its economic infrastructure. It would also help prevent further communist expansion by the Soviets.

=== Vandenburg Resolution (1948) ===
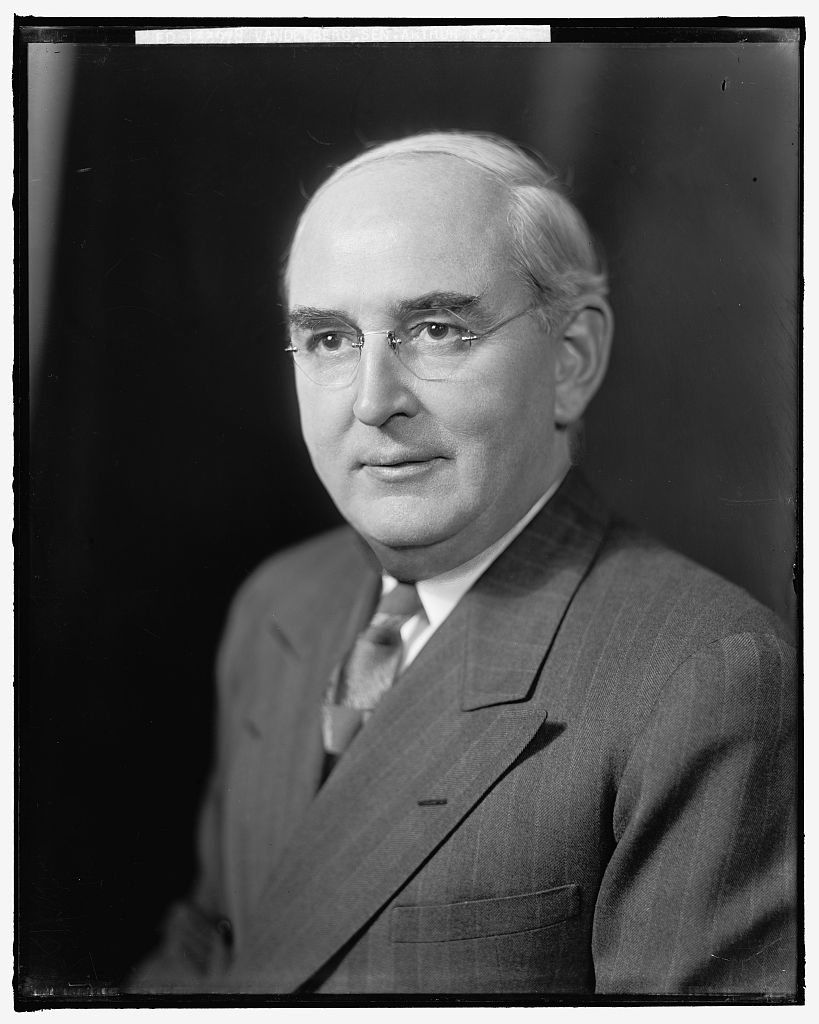
Arthur H. Vandenburg

Arthur H. Vandenburg was a Republican Senator, a former candidate for presidential nominee, and an avid supporter of multilateralism. The Vandenburg Resolution was created in 1948, after the Rio Treaty and Marshall Plan. These previous agreements, supported by the Vandenburg Resolution, gave the US the idea to create a similar collective defense agreement with Europe to prevent Soviet control. It pushed the country to create NATO and demonstrated the importance of international agreements to the country. Vandenburg's draft resolution was introduced to the Senate on June 11, 1948, where it was approved.

=== NATO (1948) ===
The North Atlantic Treaty Organization is a collective defense treaty that was created to maintain peace in the North Atlantic region. The treaty included a few features, but the most prominent was the aspect of collective defense. At the time, the US and European nations were worried about the expansion of the Soviet Union. A collective defense agreement would protect nations from being defenseless in the face of a Soviet invasion. The initial idea for the organization was suggested in the Vandenburg Resolution. In 1948, the US, the UK, and Canada, began to brainstorm NATO. 12 members signed the treaty in 1949 in Washington, DC, US.

=== ANZUS (1951) ===
ANZUS, signed in 1951 between Australia, New Zealand, and the US, was not considered a mutual defense treaty, but was more akin to "mutual aid". Similar to the other treaties in the period of Pactomania, ANZUS was a collective security treaty, where in the event of an attack on one of the members, the conflict would be settled by peaceful means.

The US deemed the idea unnecessary until the three nations shared their concerns regarding the spread of communism. The idea for the alliance was proposed by the US toward Australia, and was extended to New Zealand.

The alliance has never been formally concluded, but in 1984, when New Zealand banned nuclear weapons, the US cut ties, treaty-wise, with New Zealand.

=== Treaty of Peace with Japan and US-Japan Security Treaty (1951) ===
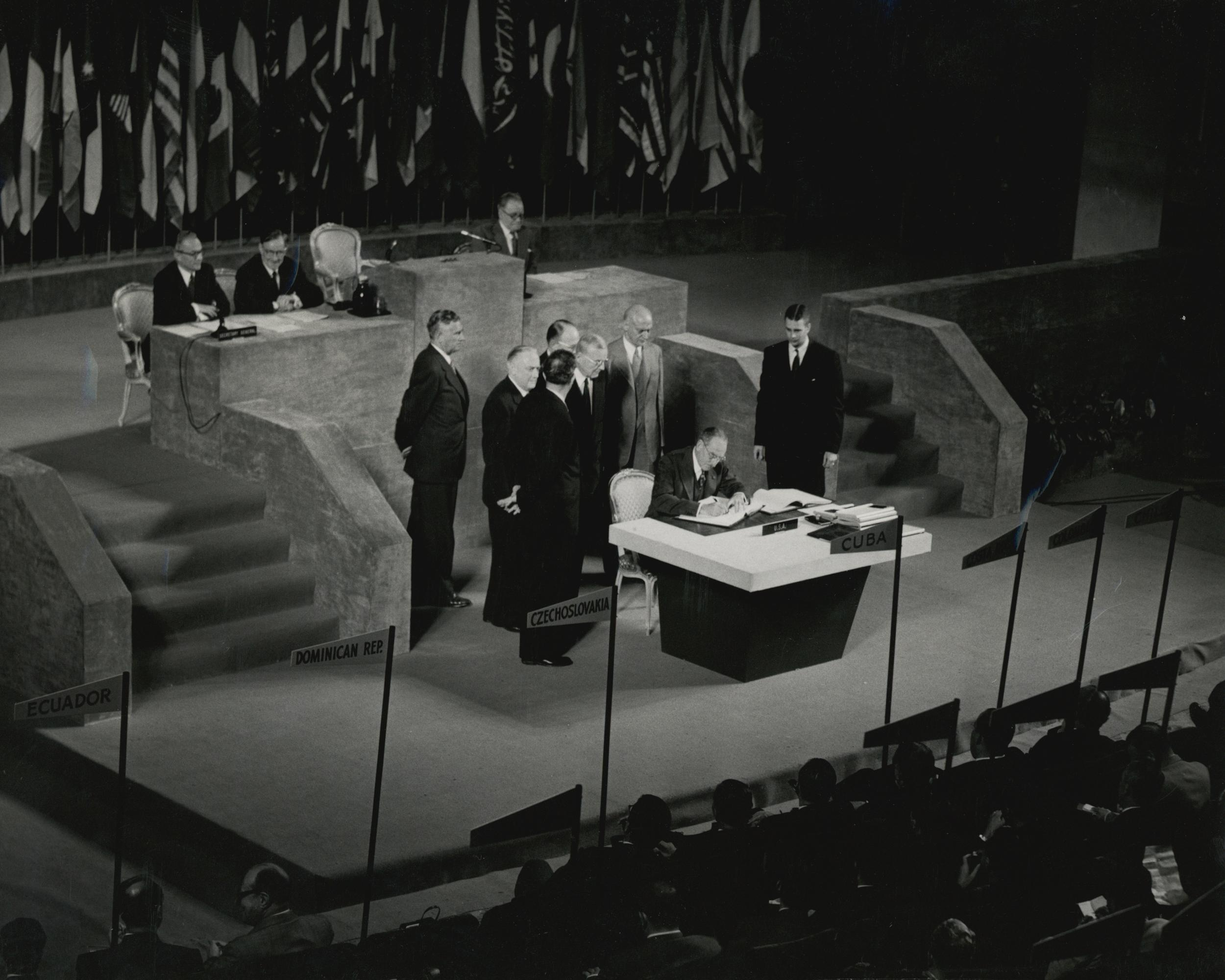
Treaty of Peace with Japan

The Japanese Peace Treaty was created after World War II to end hostilities with Japan. It also settled some land disputes with China, Japan, the Soviet Union, and the US, and compensate people who were harmed in the war. However, it did not guarantee that foreign military occupation would leave Japan. It was signed in San Francisco, California, US on September 8, 1951. Shortly after that, the US and Japan created a mutual security treaty.

=== US-Republic of the Philippines Mutual Defense Treaty (1951) ===
This treaty was made to maintain peace in the Philippines and surrounding Pacific region. It is a bilateral defense agreement, denoting that if either of the nations were to be put in danger, the other would be allowed to use military force to come to their aid. The US and the Philippines have been allies and maintained the treaty since it was created. It is one of the longest-lasting mutual defense treaties in the world.

=== US-Republic of Korea Mutual Defense Treaty (1953) ===
The US-Republic of Korea Mutual Defense Treaty is a bilateral defense agreement between the US and South Korea. Similar to ANZUS, if either of the members faced conflict, the other would defend them using peaceful methods, including defensive military approaches. The treaty was signed in 1953 following the Korean War. The purpose is to offer South Korea protection from the two nations' common enemy, the Democratic People's Republic of Korea (DPRK).

=== SEATO (1954) ===
SEATO member countries map

The Southeast Asia Treaty Organization (SEATO), also known as the Manila Pact, was a defense treaty made between several countries inside and outside of Southeast Asia. Its purpose was to protect against the spread of communism in Southeast Asia and to help improve conditions in the region.The original members included the US, France, the UK, New Zealand, Australia, the Philippines, and Thailand. There are also "observer" countries, who were still protected under the pact, but could not influence it in other ways.

The organization was officially created in Manila, Philippines in 1955, hence the name. Its headquarters were located in Bangkok, Thailand. SEATO split in 1977.

=== Sino-American Mutual Defense Treaty (1954) ===
A mutual defense alliance between the US and Taiwan existed from 1955 until its unilateral nullification by President Jimmy Carter in 1979 as the US recognized the communist mainland. The US Supreme Court affirmed the president's right to nullify the treaty in Goldwater v. Carter. Following its nullification, the treaty was supplanted by the Taiwan Relations Act, passed by Congress in 1979.

=== METO (1955) ===
The Middle East Treaty Organization (METO), also known as the Baghdad Pact, was a mutual security treaty to contribute to peace in the Middle East. The US produced the idea for the pact, but remained an observer to it for the duration of the pact's existence. The title of the treaty has been changed from METO and was relocated and renamed the Central Treaty Organization (CENTO) after tensions between the organization and Arab states, particularly Iraq. After the overthrowing of the Shah in the Iranian Revolution, CENTO ended in 1979.

== See also ==
- Cold War
- Soviet Union
- George Marshall
- John Foster Dulles
- Arthur Vandenberg
- Harry Truman
- Dwight Eisenhower
- United Nations
- Rio Treaty
- Marshall Plan
- Vandenberg resolution
- NATO
- US-Philippines Mutual Defense Treaty
- Treaty of San Francisco
- US-Japan Security Alliance
- ANZUS
- Mutual Defense Treaty (United States–South Korea)
- SEATO
- NEATO
- METO
