= Southeast Asia Friendship and Economic Treaty =

1959 failed attempt to formally establish a regional economic pact

SEAFET
Southeast Asia Friendship and Economic Treaty
- Type: Unratified treaty
- Amendment: Bangkok Declaration (1961)
- Replaced by: Association of Southeast Asia
- Expiration: 31 July 1961
- Ratifiers: 2 / 6
- Depositary: Malaysia

The Southeast Asia Friendship and Economic Treaty (SEAFET) was an unratified international treaty intended to create a economic grouping consisting of Southeast Asian states. It was proposed by Tunku Abdul Rahman as an independent economic regional organization, however as failures of its ineffectiveness would later become a de-facto arm of the Southeast Asia Treaty Organization (SEATO) in the matters of economic cooperation. The treaty would later be repurposed to create the Association of Southeast Asia (ASA), the precursor of ASEAN.

== Background ==
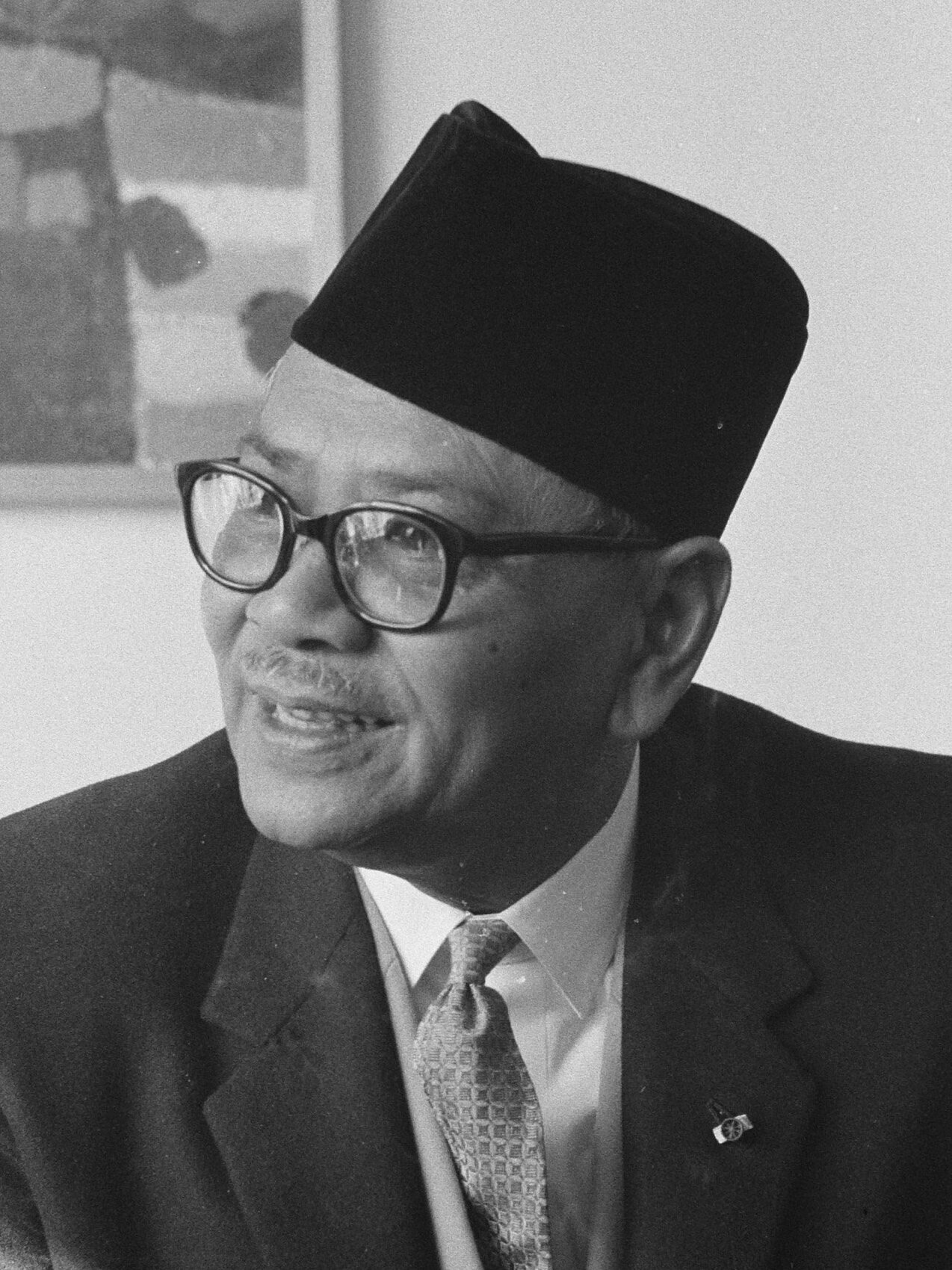
Tunku Abdul Rahman, Prime and Foreign Minister of Malaysia

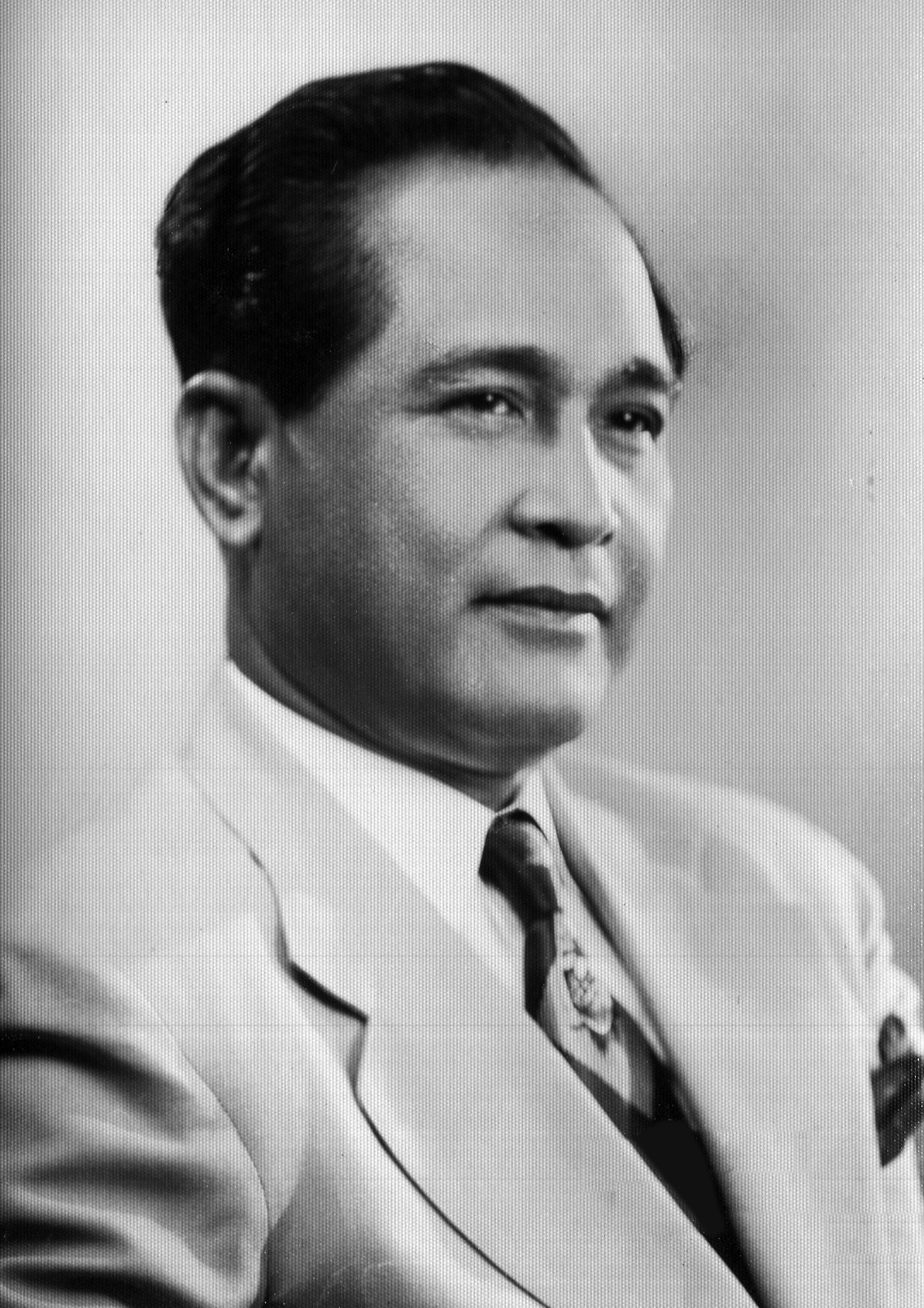
Carlos P. Garcia, President of the Philippines

In the late 1950s, newly independent Southeast Asian states began seeking frameworks for regional cooperation to safeguard their autonomy amid Cold War pressures. Malaya’s Prime Minister Tunku Abdul Rahman emerged as a key proponent of an indigenous regional pact. In February 1958, during a visit to Colombo, Tunku urged closer cooperation among the proposing "smaller Southeast Asian countries", warning that Southeast Asian nations were "too much inclined to dance to the tune of bigger nations" and should not be preoccupied with global or Afro-Asian power politics at the expense of solving regional problems.

Instead, he advocated building unity and understanding among themselves; otherwise, they would be forced to seek protection from outside powers, undermining the meaning of their newly-won independence. This vision was driven in part by common security concerns as Tunku noted that countries like Vietnam, Laos, Cambodia, and Thailand faced similar challenges with communist subversion and needed to exchange ideas on countering. Malaya, though allied with Britain via a defense agreement, was keen to complement that pact with a regional alliance that would reduce sole dependence on external powers. At the same time, Tunku sought an alternative to a bilateral security arrangement with Indonesia, which he feared could create another form of dependence. These considerations set the stage for a multilateral approach to regional unity.

The concept crystallized during Tunku’s state visit to the Philippines in January 1959. Meeting President Carlos P. Garcia in Baguio, he declared that "a new South-East Asian mental approach was required" for regional affairs. He also recalled a prior proposal he had made at a United Nations Economic Commission for Asia and the Far East (ECAFE) meeting for an "economic charter" to boost regional development. At the conclusion of this visit, Tunku and President Garcia issued a joint communiqué articulating the foundational ideas of what would soon be called SEAFET. The communiqué emphasized the "friendship [and] racial kinship" between their nations and affirmed a shared determination to meet "the challenge of communism" in the region. They agreed on the urgent need to raise living standards and develop closer economic cooperation, initially between Malaya and the Philippines, and by extension among all Southeast Asian countries. Crucially, they invited other countries in the region to subscribe to this idea, proposing that representatives meet to discuss concrete ways and means of cooperation. Beyond economics, the communiqué highlighted forging cultural ties and solving common problems together, with a call for regional leaders to meet more frequently in person.

== Drafting ==
Following the Baguio conference, Malaya and the Philippines moved to flesh out the concept of SEAFET throughout 1959. Malayan diplomats began quietly gauging interest and formulating a framework in consultation with their Philippine counterparts. Early discussions emphasized that the envisioned alliance would focus on economic collaboration and cultural exchange rather than military commitments, so as not to alarm neutral countries. Tunku Abdul Rahman initially conceived a core grouping of Malaya, the Philippines and Indonesia, three nations he saw as bound by "affinities of race and language" (the Malay‐Polynesian cultural heritage). The underlying aim, however, was to strengthen these nations against communist influence, an objective Tunku believed Indonesia’s ostensibly anti-communist leaders might quietly share. Malayan officials like Zaiton Ibrahim, of the External Affairs Ministry, indicated that Thailand was seen as "the most logical first addition" to the core trio, given its geographic importance and anti-communist stance. Throughout mid-1959, Malaya’s representatives worked to refine the proposal in consultation with the Philippines, treating it as a purely Southeast Asian initiative "that they can feel is their own" as a deliberate effort to differentiate it from Western-led alliances like SEATO.

By October 1959, Tunku Abdul Rahman took a decisive step: he sent formal letters to the heads of government of eight Southeast Asian countries, inviting them to consider joining the Southeast Asia Friendship and Economic Treaty. The countries approached were Malaya’s regional peers; explicitly, along with Malaya itself, the envisioned treaty would involve the Philippines, Indonesia, Cambodia, Laos, Burma, Thailand, and South Vietnam. By November, iIn pitching SEAFET to this wide group, Malaya and the Philippines sought to present it as an inclusive regional pact for cooperation, rather than a narrow or military bloc. Indeed, Malaya had initially considered a bilateral Malaya–Philippines treaty open for others to accede, but by late 1959 they switched to a multilateral simultaneous approach to avoid perceptions of an exclusive club.

Thailand’s stance during this developmental phase evolved significantly. Initially, Thai leaders were hesitant to become involved in SEAFET. In 1959 Thailand’s attention was preoccupied with the worsening communist insurgency in neighboring Laos, and Bangkok was unsure about the viability of Tunku’s proposal. Moreover, Thailand at the time still had some remaining confidence in the U.S.-led SEATO alliance for its security, given that SEATO had been protecting Thai interests (Thailand was a founding SEATO member) However, as the Laotian crisis deepened and SEATO proved ineffectual in responding, Thai foreign policy makers grew disillusioned with relying solely on SEATO. Foreign Minister Thanat Khoman later reflected that it was "useless and even dangerous to hitch [Thailand’s] destiny to far away powers" who might disengage at critical moments. Razak and Ismail, the Malayan leaders, found the Thai leaders enthusiastic when they visited Bangkok in June, Zaiton said, and they had undertaken to put some comments on Malaya's draft proposals in writing. Thus, over the course of 1959, Thailand warmed to the idea of an indigenous regional grouping. By July 1959, the Thai government even drafted a "Preliminary Working Paper on Cooperation in Southeast Asia," which stressed economic benefits and an informal format for any new organization This document noted that cooperation should focus on practical projects (development, trade, etc.), yet it tellingly suggested that the group might take up "any concrete and practical problem" affecting the region, whether political or economic, so long as military matters were excluded.

== Rejection ==
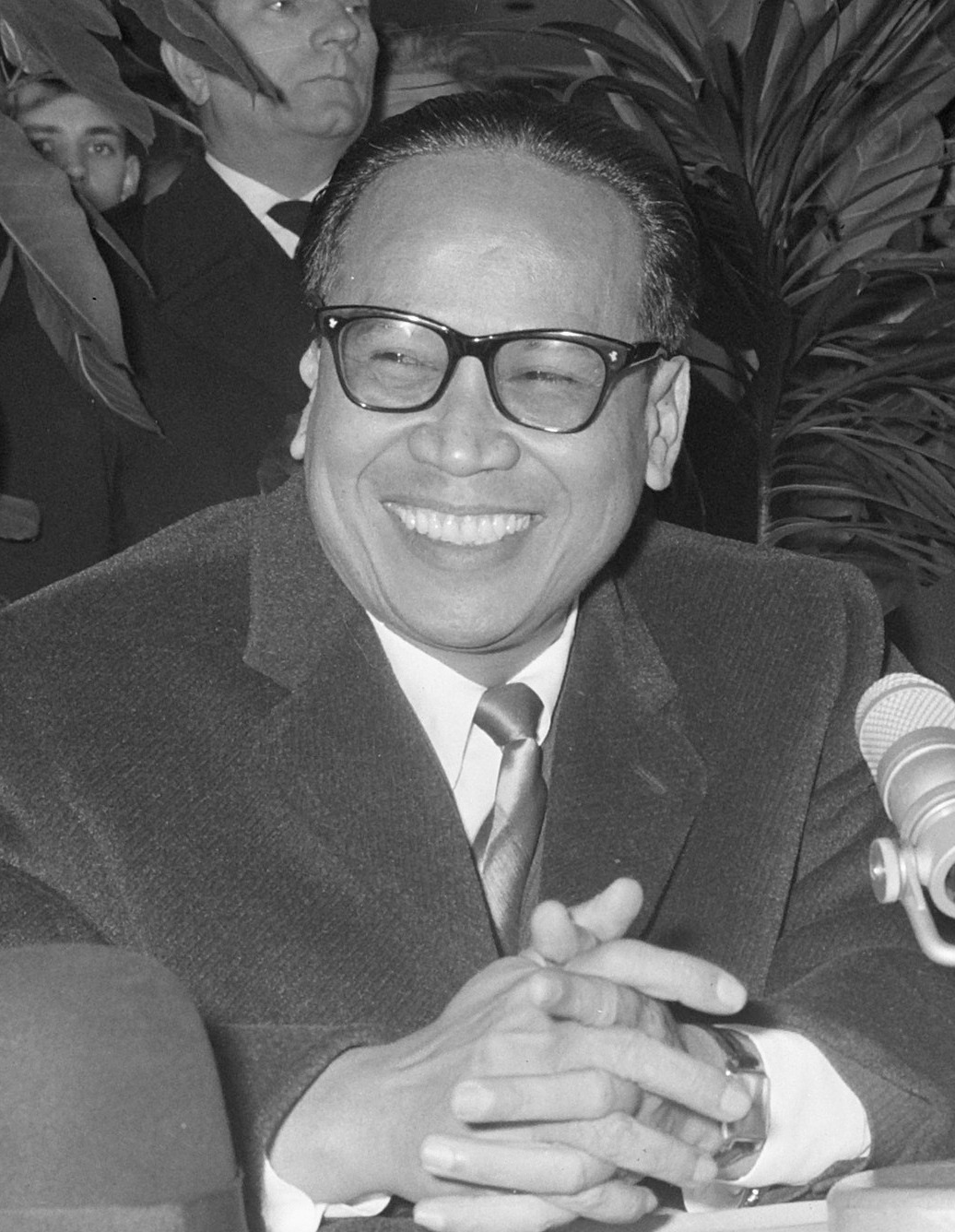
Indonesian Foreign Minister, Subandrio, silently rejected most proposals concerning regionalism.

Once Tunku Abdul Rahman circulated his SEAFET proposal in October 1959, the reactions from Southeast Asian capitals were mixed, revealing deep divisions in regional alignments. Indonesia’s response was the most crucial for the treaty and, ultimately, the most negative. President Sukarno’s government in Jakarta viewed SEAFET with suspicion and prideful hesitation. Western diplomats observed that Indonesia was "almost certainly unready to sacrifice what she considers to be her position of influence among the larger group of Bandung [Afro-Asian] powers for any formal alliance, Pan-Malayan, Southeast Asian or otherwise." Sukarno had cast himself as a leader of the broader Non-Aligned Movement after the 1955 Bandung Conference, and joining a smaller regional pact risked diluting that leadership role. Moreover, Indonesian elites resented the implication that they should "accept leadership from Malaya, a nation they regard as their junior in age, experience and influence." Jakarta was unwilling to be one among equals in a project spearheaded by the much smaller and newer Federation of Malaya. Indonesian officials, such as Foreign Minister Subandrio, also made clear their preference for bilateral agreements over multilateral ones. They feared that a formal regional pact could constrain Indonesia’s freedom of action. Another concern was ideological: Malaya’s co-sponsor, the Philippines, was a close U.S. ally and member of SEATO, which made Indonesians suspect that SEAFET could be a thinly veiled pro-Western or anti-communist front. By early 1960, Indonesia had formally rejected the SEAFET invitation, delivering a serious blow to the envisioned pan–Southeast Asian pact.
