= Association of Southeast Asia =

Former international organization of Southeast Asian countries

- - Malay: Persatuan Asia Tenggara
  - Filipino: Samahan ng Timog-Silangang Asya
  - Thai: สมาคมเอเชียตะวันออกเฉียงใต้
- Founding members of the Association of Southeast Asia
- Official languages: Malay; Filipino; Thai
- Type: Regional organization
- Founding members: 3 member states: Malaya; Philippines; Thailand

Establishment
  - Formation: July 31, 1961
  - Replaced by ASEAN: August 8, 1967
Preceded by	Succeeded by
SEAFET	ASEAN

The Association of Southeast Asia (ASA) was a regional organization established on July 31, 1961, in Bangkok, Thailand, by Malaya (now Malaysia), the Philippines, and Thailand. Its primary aim was to foster economic, social, cultural, and scientific cooperation among its member countries. However, ASA faced challenges, including regional disputes and political differences, which limited its effectiveness. These limitations led to the formation of the Association of Southeast Asian Nations (ASEAN) on August 8, 1967, which expanded membership and scope to promote regional stability and development more effectively.

== Background ==
In the late 1950s, Southeast Asian leaders began exploring a region-led framework for cooperation amid the Cold War and the newly-won independence of many states. Earlier attempts at regionalism, such as the 1950 Baguio Conference initiated by the Philippines and the Southeast Asia Treaty Organization (SEATO, 1954), had either been limited or dominated by external powers. By 1959, leaders of Malaya (independent in 1957) and the Philippines saw the need for a purely Southeast Asian alliance. In January 1959, during Malayan Prime Minister Tunku Abdul Rahman's visit to Manila, Philippine President Carlos P. Garcia and he, together with Philippine Foreign Minister Felixberto M. Serrano, issued a joint communiqué proposing an "association of Southeast Asia" for economic and cultural cooperation. This was the first time the idea of a regional alliance led by Southeast Asian nations was formally put forward. The proposal reflected shared postcolonial interests: both Malaya and the Philippines were staunchly anti-communist (each had fought communist insurgencies at home) and sought a united front to preserve regional stability without overt reliance on Western military pacts. At the same time, they emphasized an Asian-led initiative, independent of the former colonial powers, to encourage cooperation in the spirit of the 1955 Bandung Conference's principles of Afro-Asian solidarity.

The geopolitical context of Southeast Asia in 1959 was complex. The region was bifurcated between U.S.-aligned states (like the Philippines and Thailand, both SEATO members) and neutral or socialist-leaning ones (such as Indonesia under Sukarno, Burma under U Nu, and newly independent Cambodia under Sihanouk). The Malayan-Philippine proposal for an Association of Southeast Asia (ASA) was thus met with cautious reactions. Serrano initially felt it would be "presumptuous" for only a few countries to form a regional body; he preferred including at least a fourth nation. This led to overtures to other Southeast Asian states in 1959–1960. Rahman and Garcia reached out to leaders in Burma, Indonesia, Thailand, Cambodia, Laos, and South Vietnam, inviting them to join a broad regional grouping. A working committee outlined that the proposed association would prioritize cooperation in economic, social, technical, educational, and cultural fields, while remaining strictly non-political and neutral in ideology (explicitly upholding the Bandung principles).

== Formation ==
Signatories of the First Bangkok Declaration

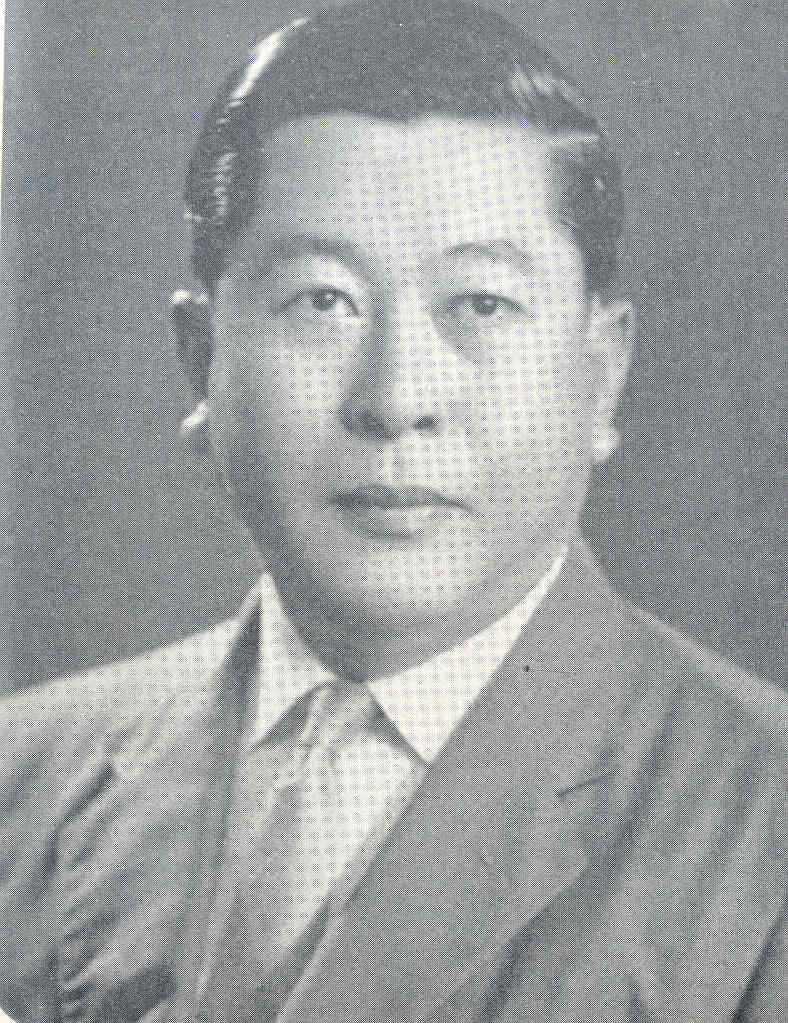
Thanat Khoman, Foreign Minister of Thailand

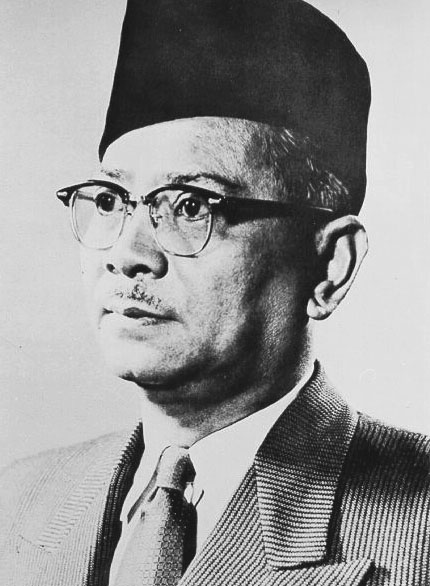
Tunku Abdul Rahman, Prime and Foreign Minister of Malaysia

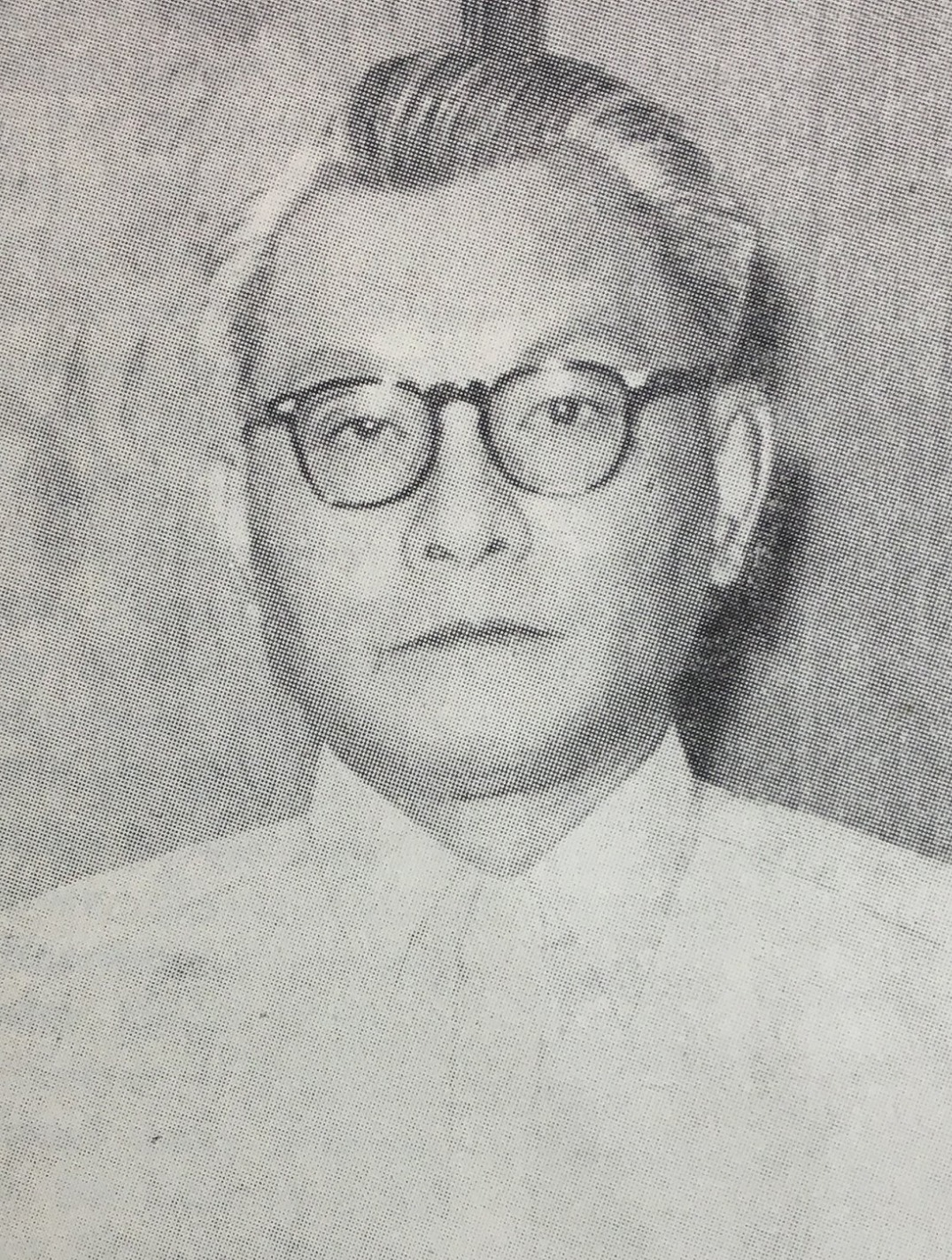
Felixberto M. Serrano, Secretary of Foreign Affairs of the Philippines

Despite the inclusive invitations, many regional governments demurred. Burma's leaders agreed in principle but ultimately declined, citing a need to focus on domestic problems and a desire to maintain strict neutrality. Cambodia's Prince Sihanouk likewise refused to participate, wary that a joint regional organization might divide the world into Cold War blocs and compromise Cambodia's non-aligned stance. Indonesia was openly skeptical from the start. President Sukarno felt a new alliance was unnecessary given the existing Bandung Pact; he argued that ASA's proposed goals were already covered by the 1955 Asian-African Conference solidarity, and he saw ASA as potentially "unrealistic and useless". Privately, Sukarno also perceived the move as a challenge to his leadership in regional politics. Sukarno had quietly resented that the initiative had come from Kuala Lumpur and Manila, suspecting it might erode his prominence as a champion of Asian nationalism. Indeed, Indonesian officials feared ASA would "degenerate into a simple anti-Communist club" aligned with Western interests, given that Malaya and the Philippines both had defense ties with the UK and US. These factors meant Indonesia (as well as other neutral states) pointedly stayed away, leaving the proponents to proceed largely on their own.

By 1960, it became clear that only Thailand was willing to join Malaya and the Philippines in the venture. Thailand's Prime Minister Sarit Thanarat and Foreign Minister Thanat Khoman were motivated to participate partly because of Thailand's frustration with SEATO's ineffectiveness (especially during the 1960–61 Laos crisis). Thailand faced growing communist subversion in neighboring Indochina and saw a non-military regional pact as a useful "balance" to its SEATO commitments. Thus, Thailand quietly entered discussions in late 1959, making three like-minded nations at the table. Over 1960–61 the tri-nation talks gained momentum. In April 1960, Rahman sent a special envoy to Manila to work out concrete steps with Philippine officials. By early 1961, planning was far advanced. In February 1961, President Garcia paid a state visit to Malaya; during this visit the Philippine and Malayan leaders (with Thailand's Foreign Minister present) agreed on measures to increase trade and cultural links as a precursor to the new association. In a joint press conference in Kuala Lumpur, they announced that Malaya, the Philippines, and Thailand would formally establish a regional organization within the year. A series of preparatory meetings followed, and a draft charter was prepared.

On 31 July 1961, the Foreign Ministers of Malaya, Thailand, and the Philippines met in Bangkok and signed what became known as the Bangkok Declaration establishing the Association of Southeast Asia (ASA). This short document (essentially an executive agreement) declared the formation of "an association for economic and cultural cooperation among the countries of Southeast Asia to be known as ASA – Association of Southeast Asia". The founding signatories were Thailand's Thanat Khoman, Malaya's Tunku Abdul Rahman (who was both Prime Minister and Foreign Minister), and the Philippines' Felixberto Serrano. With that, ASA became the first regional organization exclusively comprising Southeast Asian states. Notably, the name "ASA" was fitting as in Malay, Thai, and Tagalog asa means "hope," symbolizing the aspirations pinned on the new alliance.

== Objectives and framework ==
The ASA charter and early statements laid out the alliance's objectives in idealistic but general terms. The association was to promote regional cooperation in economic, social, cultural, scientific, and administrative fields, as well as to encourage mutual assistance for prosperity and security. ASA's goal, as described by Tunku Abdul Rahman, was to show that the peoples of Southeast Asia "can think and plan for themselves... to get things done in our own way without control or influence from outside". This vision echoed a postcolonial desire for self-determination, doing things "by Asian hands" as Thai minister Thanat Khoman put it, while improving the welfare of their nations. Importantly, ASA was explicitly not a military pact or collective defense treaty. The member states presented it as a non-aligned, apolitical grouping open to any Southeast Asian country able to "accept the principles" of peaceful cooperation. In practice, however, all three founding members were strongly anti-communist and closely aligned with Western powers. Tunku Abdul Rahman even candidly remarked in parliament that ASA "would be open to all but the Communist countries," underscoring that the alliance of "property-owning democracies" had an inherent ideological orientation. This divergence between stated non-alignment and actual anti-communist solidarity made other regional players (especially Indonesia and Cambodia) skeptical of ASA's true intent. Some observers at the time noted that ASA's economic-cultural focus was something of a façade as the hope among its members was that closer cooperation would eventually spill over into the political and security realm.

Structurally, ASA was a relatively loose organization, lacking a formal constitution or secretariat. The Bangkok Declaration was brief and did not establish a centralized bureaucracy; instead, coordination was to be managed through regular meetings and national focal points. In 1962, the ASA Foreign Ministers held a special meeting in the Cameron Highlands (Malaya) where they agreed on a basic institutional framework. They set up three standing committees (Economic, Social and Cultural, and Finance) to plan and implement cooperative projects in those spheres. A small ASA Fund was created to finance joint activities, with Malaysia (Malaya) and Thailand each initially contributing M$1 million (the Philippines was expected to match this). It was also decided that annual meetings of ASA foreign ministers would be held, rotating among the three member states. Following after the inaugural 1961 Bangkok meeting, a second ASA ministerial meeting took place in Kuala Lumpur in 1962, and a third was anticipated in Manila in 1963. Between these high-level meetings, working groups and the standing committees would carry forward the alliance's programs. In the absence of a permanent secretariat, the chair (host country) would coordinate activities for the year. This informal setup was modest in size and ambition, and thus did not yet require a large bureaucracy.

== Early initiatives ==
Though ASA's membership was small, the three countries moved quickly to demonstrate tangible cooperation. In the months following the Bangkok Declaration, several joint projects were launched. For example, in 1962 Malaya and Thailand linked their railway systems and inaugurated the "ASA Express" train service between Kuala Lumpur and Bangkok. The inaugural train ran in April 1962 amid much fanfare, carrying Thai officials to Malaya. Likewise, to improve regional communications, the members agreed to extend a microwave telecommunications network between Malaysia and Thailand and to include the Philippines in a high-frequency radio link, an early step toward better telephonic and broadcast connections across borders.

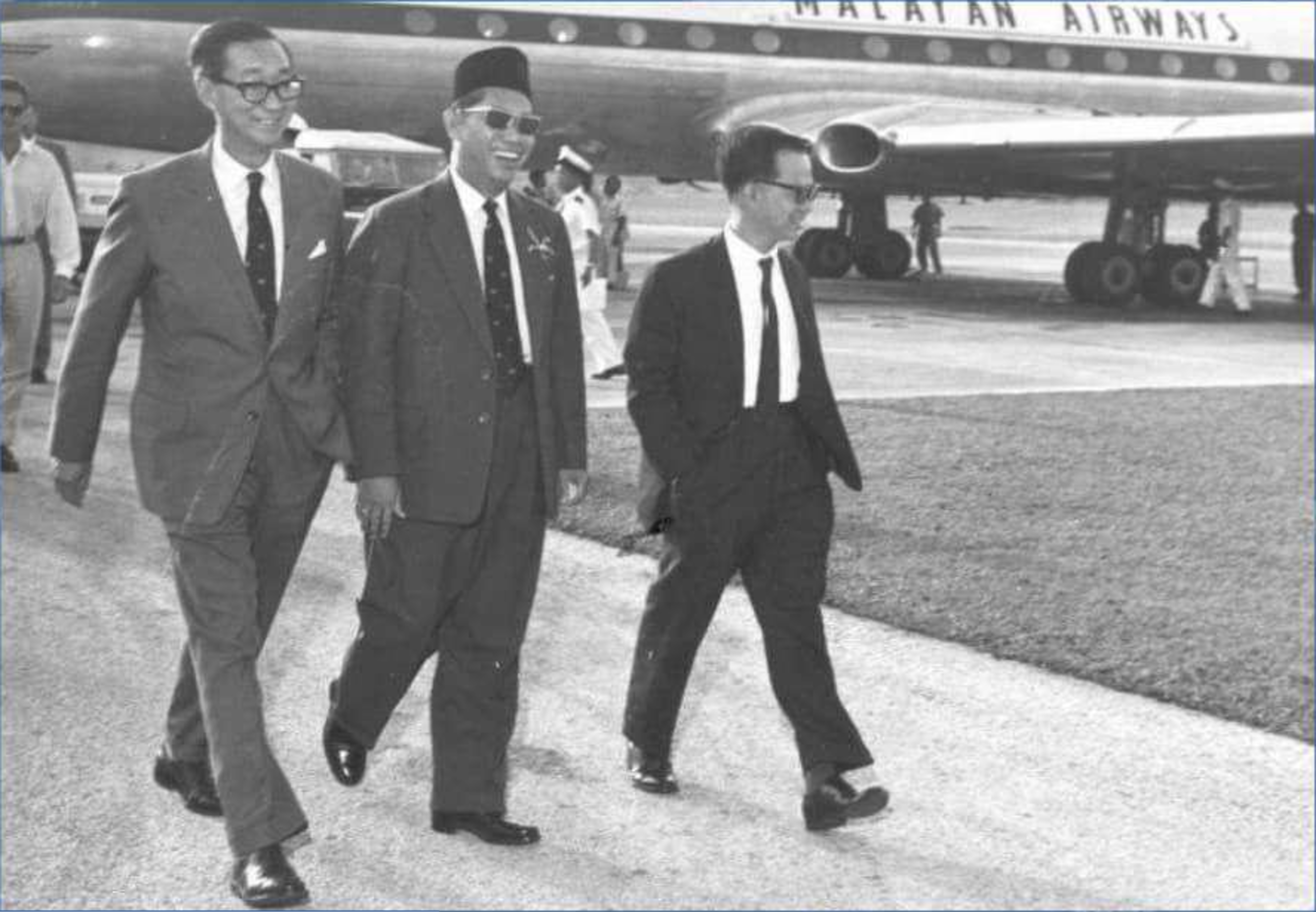
Dato Haji Sardon bin Haji Jubir leading the Malayan delegation to the ASA air services integration agreement signing ceremony in Bangkok, 9 January 1963

Economic cooperation was pursued through plans for trade facilitation. The ASA foreign ministers approved the negotiation of trilateral agreements on trade and navigation, aiming to boost commerce among the three economies. Although intra-ASA trade was very low at the time (less than 1% of each country's trade), these measures were seen as building blocks for future economic integration. They also agreed to promote Southeast Asian tourism jointly and even discussed the idea of an "ASA Airways" cooperative airline venture, merging Malayan Airways (which later split to Malaysia Airlines and Singapore Airlines) with the Thai Airways Company (which became the Thai Airways International). In the social sphere, ASA initiated notable exchanges in healthcare and education. The Philippines dispatched a team of medical doctors to rural Malaya to help bolster medical services, a form of technical aid between developing countries. A formal agreement was put in place for the Philippines to recruit and send doctors on fixed tours to Malaya, which was in need of physicians for its rural health programs. In return, Malaya and Thailand offered training slots for personnel from each other's countries. The trio also waived visa requirements and fees for each other's citizens (at least for officials and certain passport holders) to facilitate easier travel. Cultural and student exchange programs were set up, and efforts were made to recognize each other's university degrees to encourage educational cooperation.

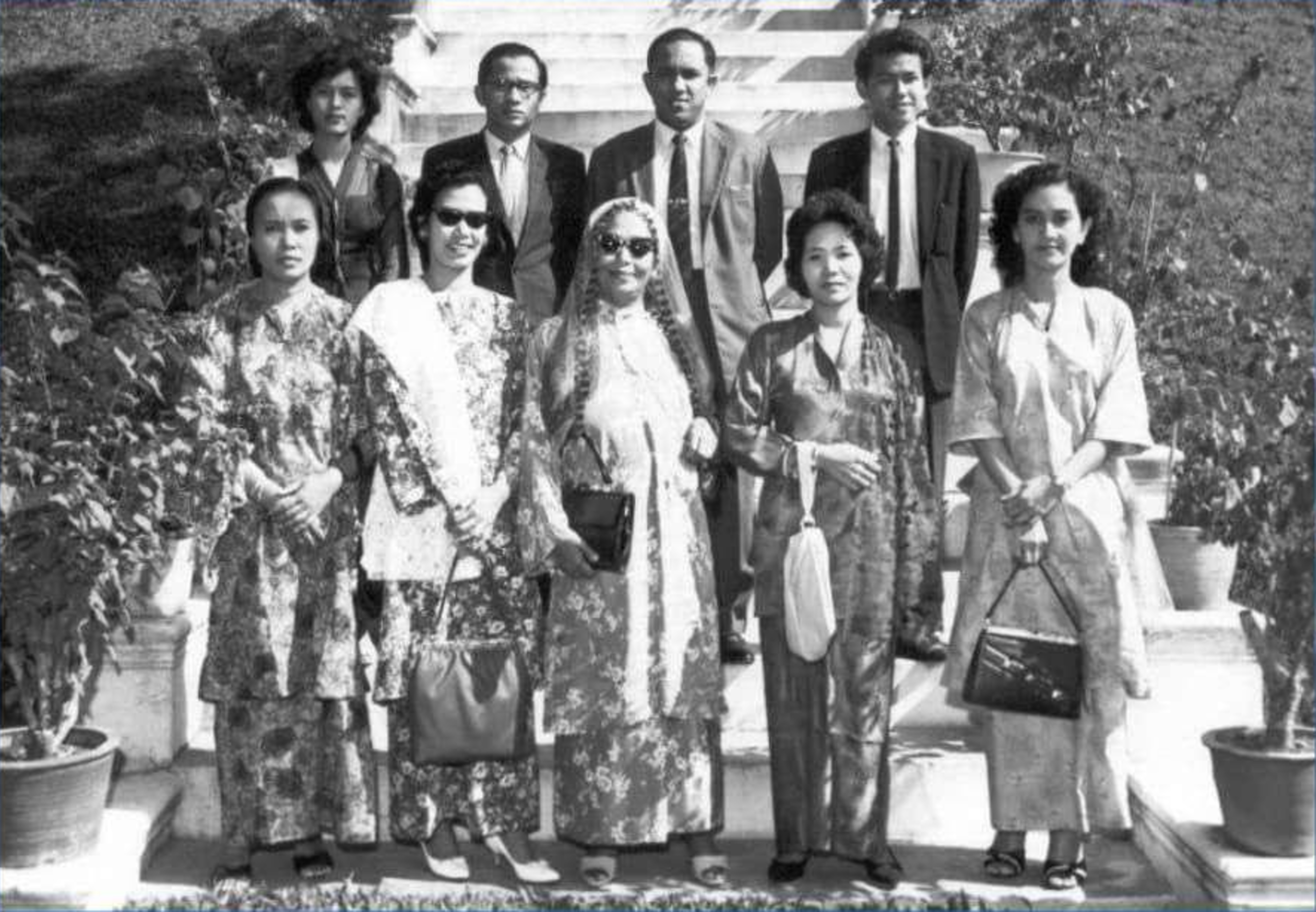
First delegation from the Federation of Malaya on a two-week study visit to Thailand under ASA sponsorship, 5 September 1962

These early ASA initiatives, while modest, were meaningful. They showed that regional cooperation was achievable on a South–South basis. Thai, Malayan, and Filipino leaders often spoke in glowing terms of ASA's promise. Philippine Vice-President Emmanuel Pelaez, at an ASA meeting, toasted "Mabuhay ang ASA — long life to ASA," expressing the hope that through ASA, "millions of people in our countries may find a true brotherhood... in the sunlight of education... and fulfillment of human personality". Such rhetoric underscored ASA's aspirational objectives: uplifting the region's welfare and forging a shared Southeast Asian identity. At the same time, realities on the ground kept expectations in check. All three economies were agrarian and competitive more than complementary, so immediate economic gains from ASA were limited. Linguistic and educational gaps impeded some exchanges (for instance, English was commonly used in Malaya and the Philippines, but much less so in Thailand, complicating academic cooperation). Moreover, without Indonesia or Burma, the region's largest markets and resources were outside ASA's framework, meaning ASA could not tackle issues like the global rubber market or regional industrialization.

== Decline ==
ASA's momentum proved difficult to sustain as political tensions in the region escalated in the early 1960s. Ironically, one of the first major strains came from within ASA's own ranks; a bilateral dispute between the Philippines and Malaya over North Borneo (Sabah). In May 1961 (just as ASA was taking shape), Tunku Abdul Rahman announced a grand plan to federate Malaya with the British territories of Singapore, North Borneo, Sarawak, and Brunei into a new nation to be called Malaysia. Initially, the Philippine government under President Garcia had not objected. But after Diosdado Macapagal assumed the Philippine presidency in late 1961, Manila's stance changed. Macapagal's administration revived a dormant Philippine claim to North Borneo, asserting historical sovereignty over Sabah. On 22 June 1962, the Philippines formally submitted this territorial claim, sparking a serious rift with Kuala Lumpur. Tunku Abdul Rahman viewed the claim as an affront to Malaya's territorial aspirations, and the issue quickly poisoned relations between the two ASA members. By the end of 1962, the Sabah dispute had, in effect, paralyzed ASA's activities. Joint projects were put on hold and trust between Malaya and the Philippines eroded. Tunku pointedly boycotted an ASA ministerial meeting scheduled in Manila for December 1962, making it impossible for the alliance to function. Filipino leaders, for their part, felt that Malaya's push for Malaysia (including Sabah) was subject to the outcome of the Philippine claim to North Borneo, and in late 1962 Manila began aligning its regional policy more closely with Indonesia – ASA's outsider.

At the same time, Sukarno's Indonesia vehemently opposed the creation of the Federation of Malaysia, which it denounced as a neo-colonial scheme. In early 1963, Indonesia launched the Konfrontasi ("Confrontation") campaign, involving economic boycotts and armed incursions, to sabotage Malaysia's formation. President Macapagal, despite ASA, felt compelled to cooperate with Indonesia against Malaysia. He saw common cause in preventing what he portrayed as British-imposed federation. Throughout 1963, the Philippines and Indonesia coordinated diplomatically in hopes of delaying or conditioning the birth of Malaysia. Thus the dispute and start of the Konfrontasi had led to the destruction of ASA.

== ASA to ASEAN ==
By 1965–1966, the situation began to shift. Sukarno was ousted from power in Indonesia and General Suharto's new regime moved to end Konfrontasi. In August 1966, Indonesia and Malaysia signed a peace agreement, formally concluding Konfrontasi. The Philippines, now under President Ferdinand Marcos (who succeeded Macapagal in 1965), also normalized relations with Malaysia around the same time (Marcos quietly shelved the Sabah issue to mend fences). These developments eliminated the principal obstacles to regional cooperation, leading to a revival of the idea of Southeast Asian solidarity. However, for the former member states, it became evident that the Association of Southeast Asia (ASA) could no longer serve as a viable framework for such collaboration. Although ASA was never formally dissolved through an international treaty, by 1966, it had become largely inactive and officially dissolved in practice. Nevertheless, its legacy proved instructive. The failure of both ASA and Malphilindo demonstrated to regional leaders the need for a new model, one that would incorporate all major Southeast Asian countries and establish stronger norms to mitigate the risk of internal disputes undermining the organization. These insights directly influenced the formation of the Association of Southeast Asian Nations (ASEAN) in 1967.

== See also ==
- History of ASEAN
