= Chapter VII of the United Nations Charter =

United Nations governing document

Chapter VII of the United Nations Charter sets out the UN Security Council's powers to maintain peace. It gives the Security Council the authority to "determine the existence of any threat to the peace, breach of the peace, or act of aggression" and to take military and nonmilitary action to "restore international peace and security.”

== Rationale ==
The UN Charter's prohibition of member states of the UN attacking other UN member states is central to the purpose for which the UN was founded in the wake of the destruction of World War II: to prevent war. This overriding concern is also reflected in the Nuremberg Trials' concept of a crime against peace "starting or waging a war against the territorial integrity, political independence or sovereignty of a state, or in violation of international treaties or agreements" (crime against peace), which was held to be the crime that makes all war crimes possible.

Chapter VII also gives the Military Staff Committee responsibility for strategic coordination of forces placed at the disposal of the Security Council. It is made up of the chiefs of staff of the five permanent members of the Council. Otherwise, that chapter is used when the UNSC is authorizing either a member state or a coalition of the willing to act nationally or through regional organizations to address this threat – if necessary with all necessary measures, including the use of outright force. The phrase ‘all necessary measures’ is to be taken literally. Any military action performed through land, air, and sea forces is specifically allowed (UN Charter Article 42). Such action could entail troop deployment, the enforcement of a no-fly-zone, even the use of aerial bombardment.

== Historical background ==
The United Nations was established after World War II and the ultimate failure of diplomacy despite the existence of the League of Nations in the years between the First and Second World War. The Security Council was thus granted broad powers through Chapter VII as a reaction to the failure of the League. These broad powers allow it to enjoy greater power than any other international organization in history. It can be argued that the strong executive powers granted to it give it the role of 'executive of the international community' or even of an 'international government'.

The covenant of the League of Nations provided, for the first time in history, enforcement of international responsibilities (i.e. adhering to the Covenant of the League of Nations) through economic and military sanctions. Member states were also obliged, even without prior decision by the council to take action against states that acted unlawfully in the eyes of the Covenant. This meant that the peace process was largely dependent on the willingness of member states, because the Covenant did not provide binding decisions; The Council of the League was only responsible for recommending military force. As well as this, Article 11 paragraph 1 of the League’s Covenant states:

Any war or threat of war, whether immediately affecting any of the Members of the League or not, is hereby declared a matter of concern to the whole League, and the League shall take any action that may be deemed wise and effectual to safeguard the peace of nations.

This can be seen as an authorization of the use of force and other enforcement measures, however, states repeatedly insisted that this did not make decisions by the League binding.

This resulted in an unprecedented will by both the powers at the Dumbarton Oaks Conference and the states present at the San Francisco Conference to submit to a central organ like that of the Security Council. Despite long debate over whether the General Assembly should also have power over decisions made by the Security Council, it was eventually decided by a large majority vote that the Security Council should maintain its executive power because, as the major powers emphasized, a strong executive organ would be needed for the maintenance of world peace. This emphasis was advocated in particular by the Chinese representative, recalling the powerlessness of the League during the Manchuria Crisis.

== Articles 41, 42, 43, and 44 ==
Articles 41 and 42 jointly establish the right of the Security Council to arrange for the use of both non-armed (Article 41) and armed (Article 42) measures to put its decisions into effect.

Article 41

The Security Council may decide what measures not involving the use of armed force are to be employed to give effect to its decisions, and it may call upon the Members of the United Nations to apply such measures. These may include complete or partial interruption of economic relations and of rail, sea, air, postal, telegraphic, radio, and other means of communication, and the severance of diplomatic relations.

Article 42

Should the Security Council consider that measures provided for in Article 41 would be inadequate or have proved to be inadequate, it may take such action by air, sea, or land forces as may be necessary to maintain or restore international peace and security. Such action may include demonstrations, blockade, and other operations by air, sea, or land forces of Members of the United Nations.

Article 43

1. All Members of the United Nations, in order to contribute to the maintenance of international peace and security, undertake to make available to the Security Council, on its call and in accordance with a special agreement or agreements, armed forces, assistance, and facilities, including rights of passage, necessary for the purpose of maintaining international peace and security.

2. Such agreement or agreements shall govern the numbers and types of forces, their degree of readiness and general location, and the nature of the facilities and assistance to be provided.

3. The agreement or agreements shall be negotiated as soon as possible on the initiative of the Security Council. They shall be concluded between the Security Council and Members or between the Security Council and groups of Members and shall be subject to ratification by the signatory states in accordance with their respective constitutional processes.

Article 44

When the Security Council has decided to use force it shall, before calling upon a Member not represented on it to provide armed forces in fulfillment of the obligations assumed under Article 43, invite that Member, if the Member so desires, to participate in the decisions of the Security Council concerning the employment of contingents of that Member's armed forces.

In 1947, the Military Staff Committee reported its recommendations to the Security Council regarding the implementation of Article 43. The Chiefs of Staff of the Permanent Members, split by Cold War politics, could not agree. Of the 41 articles in the Report of the Military Staff Committee (UN Document S/336) (April 30, 1947) only 25 could be agreed between the five powers. Thus Article 43 agreements have never been concluded. However, the Security Council remained technically seized of the matter until 1997.

=== Chapter VII Resolutions ===
Most Chapter VII resolutions (1) determine the existence of a threat to the peace, a breach of the peace, or an act of aggression in accordance with Article 39, and (2) make a decision explicitly under Chapter VII. However, not all resolutions are that explicit, there is disagreement about the Chapter VII status of a small number of resolutions. As a reaction to this ambiguity, a formal definition of Chapter VII resolutions has recently been proposed:

A Security Council Resolution is considered to be 'a Chapter VII resolution' if it makes an explicit determination that the situation under consideration constitutes a threat to the peace, a breach of the peace, or an act of aggression, and/or explicitly or implicitly states that the Council is acting under Chapter VII in the adoption of some or all operative paragraphs.

Chapter VII resolutions are very rarely isolated measures. Often the first response to a crisis is a resolution demanding the crisis be ended. This is only later followed by an actual Chapter VII resolution detailing the measures required to secure compliance with the first resolution. Sometimes dozens of resolutions are passed in subsequent years to modify and extend the mandate of the first Chapter VII resolution as the situation evolves.

The list of Chapter VII interventions includes:

- United Nations Security Council Resolution 82 (Korea)
- United Nations Security Council Resolution 1267 (Afghanistan)
- United Nations Transitional Administration in East Timor
- United Nations Mission in the Democratic Republic of Congo
- International Criminal Tribunal for Rwanda
- United Nations Mission in Sierra Leone
- United Nations Assistance Mission for Rwanda
- United Nations Angola Verification Mission II
- United Nations Operation in Somalia II
- United Nations Monitoring, Verification and Inspection Commission
- United Nations Protection Force (former Yugoslavia)
- Oil-for-Food Programme (Iraq)
- United Nations Stabilisation Mission in Haiti
- United Nations Security Council Resolution 678 (Gulf War)
- United Nations Security Council Resolution 1973 (Libya)
- United Nations Security Council Resolution 502 (Argentina)
- Special Tribunal for Lebanon
- United Nations Security Council Resolution 2699 (Haiti)

See also Timeline of United Nations peacekeeping missions, some of which were created under the authority of Chapter VI rather than VII.

Article 53 in Chapter VIII of the United Nations Charter permits "the Security Council to use regional arrangements as appropriate or to authorize enforcement action by such arrangements".

== Article 51: Self-defence ==
Article 51 recognizes the right of countries to engage in self-defence, including collective self-defence, against an armed attack and was included during the San Francisco Conference in 1945.

Nothing in the present Charter shall impair the inherent right of individual or collective self-defence if an armed attack occurs against a Member of the United Nations, until the Security Council has taken measures necessary to maintain international peace and security. Measures taken by Members in the exercise of this right of self-defence shall be immediately reported to the Security Council and shall not in any way affect the authority and responsibility of the Security Council under the present Charter to take at any time such action as it deems necessary in order to maintain or restore international peace and security.

=== Usage by sovereign countries ===
According to a study by researchers at Harvard Law School, between 1945 and 2018, UN Member States submitted 433 communications to the Security Council of measures taken in purported exercise of the right of self-defense.

This article was the impetus for much international pact-making and has been cited by the United States as support for the Nicaragua case, the 2003 invasion of Iraq, and the legality of the Vietnam War, as well as by many other countries. According to that argument, "although South Vietnam is not an independent sovereign State or a member of the United Nations, it nevertheless enjoys the right of self-defense, and the United States is entitled to participate in its collective defense." Another aspect is if the right of self-defense still exists if the UN Security Council has taken measures to deal with the conflict. There are contradictory opinions whether this right still exists once the Security Council has taken action. Article 51 has been described as difficult to adjudicate with any certainty in real-life.

In a letter to the UN Security Council requesting military intervention in Yemen, Yemen's President Hadi invoked Article 51.

The United States used Article 51 to justify the assassination of Qasem Soleimani and U.S. airstrikes in Iraq and Syria against an Iran-backed militia group.

The president of Russia, Vladimir Putin, cited Article 51 in a speech to justify the 2022 invasion of Ukraine and escalation of the war in Donbas.
