= Northeast Asia Treaty Organization =

1950s proposed collective defense organization

The Northeast Asia Treaty Organization (NEATO) was a proposed international organization for collective defense in Northeast Asia. It would have comprised the United States, Japan, South Korea, and Taiwan.

== Background ==
United States Secretary of State John Foster Dulles considered the possibility of forming such an alliance in the 1950s to balance against communist power and influence in Northeast Asia.

== Controversy ==
Two main issues prevented the organization's creation. The first was South Korean memory of Japanese rule. In spite of outstanding questions such as Japanese property in Korea, fishing in international waters, and Koreans residing in Japan having been resolved, the psychological predisposition of Koreans against the Japanese remained.

The second was the Japanese Constitution, which outlawed Japanese use of war as a means to settle international disputes. Furthermore, due to the military alliance between the United States and Japan, the United States had undertaken the role of defending Japan in case of attack by a third power in exchange for the right to station military personnel on Japanese soil and make sympathy payments to underwrite the cost of maintaining American military bases in Japan.

== Aftermath ==
In lieu of the Northeast Asia Treaty Organization, the United States resorted to the San Francisco System, focusing on separate bilateral alliances with the countries of Northeast Asia.

== See also ==
- Security Treaty between the United States and Japan
- Mutual Defense Treaty (United States–South Korea)
- Sino-American Mutual Defense Treaty
