= Thanat–Rusk communiqué =

1962 communiqué between Thailand and the United States

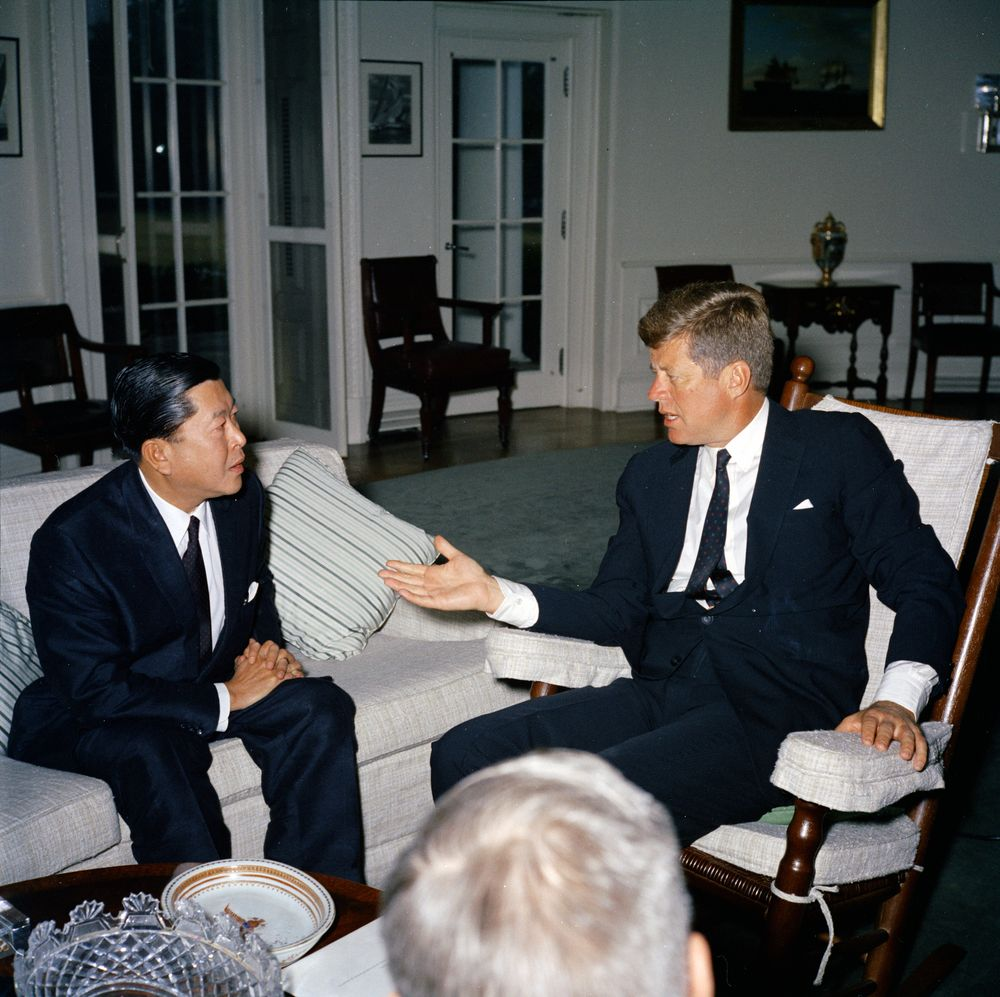
Thai Foreign Minister Thanat Khoman with United States President John F. Kennedy at the White House, 1961

The Thanat–Rusk communiqué is a bilateral diplomatic communiqué that was signed in March 1962 by Thai Foreign Minister Thanat Khoman and United States Secretary of State Dean Rusk. In the communiqué, the United States promised to come to Thailand's aid if it faced aggression from neighboring nations. The communiqué was built upon an American-Thai relationship that had been established in the 19th century, with the bilateral Treaty of Amity and Commerce of 1833. The communiqué was not a formal treaty, but it demonstrated a closer cooperation between the two countries.

== Background ==
Communist movements in countries such as Vietnam and Laos were causing the Thai government to become concerned that these insurgencies could spread to Thailand. These concerns, met with the United States' pursuit of containing communism, led Thailand to strengthen its security and establish a clear alliance with the U.S. The communiqué also reinforced Thailand's position within the Southeast Asia Treaty Organization (SEATO), which it joined in 1952. However, SEATO was considered limited in its capabilities to provide collective security.

== Impact ==
The communiqué cemented Thailand's role as an important United States ally in the Asia-Pacific region during the Cold War. In the years that followed the communiqué, the United States would help build up the Royal Thai Armed Forces and modernize Thailand's physical infrastructure. Thai forces would later become involved in the Vietnam War, wherein they supported South Vietnam from the military threats posed by North Vietnam and the Viet Cong. During the duration of the Vietnam War, the United States also gained access to Thai air bases, which supported its deployment of American military air assets as part of its forward positioning strategy.

== Legacy ==
This agreement established a long-term partnership between Thailand and the U.S. that has continued beyond the Cold War. Since its establishment, the two countries have partnered in military exercises and joint operations across the Asia-Pacific region.

== See also ==
- San Francisco System
- Mutual Defense Treaty (United States–Philippines)
- ANZUS
- Security Treaty between the United States and Japan
- Mutual Defense Treaty (United States–South Korea)
- Sino-American Mutual Defense Treaty
- Southeast Asia Treaty Organization
