= Thanat Khoman =

Thai diplomat and politician (1914-2016)

- ถนัด คอมันตร์
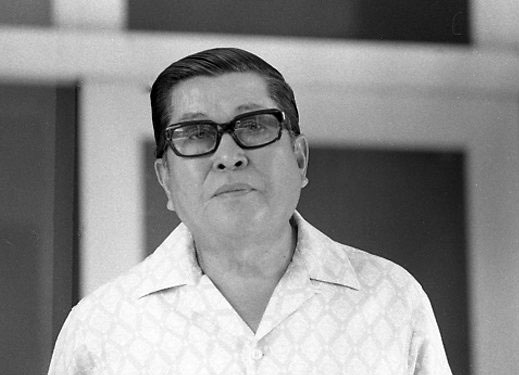
- Thanat Khoman c. 1975

Deputy Prime Minister of Thailand
- In office 11 March 1981 – 19 March 1983
- Prime Minister: Prem Tinsulanonda
- In office 3 March 1980 – 28 February 1981
- Prime Minister: Prem Tinsulanonda

Leader of the Democrat Party
- In office 26 May 1979 – 3 April 1982
- Preceded by: Seni Pramoj
- Succeeded by: Bhichai Rattakul

Minister of Foreign Affairs
- In office 20 February 1959 – 17 November 1971
- Prime Minister: Sarit Thanarat; Thanom Kittikachorn
- Preceded by: Prince Wan Waithayakon
- Succeeded by: Thanom Kittikachorn

Personal details
- Born: 9 May 1914 Bangkok, Siam
- Died: 3 March 2016 (aged 101) Bangkok, Thailand
- Party: Democrat
- Other political affiliations: Free Thai Movement
- Spouse: Molee Khoman
- Education: University of Bordeaux; University of Paris (Ph.D.)

Military service
- Allegiance: Thailand
- Branch/service: Royal Thai Army
- Years of service: 1963–2016
- Rank: Senior Colonel

Thanat Khoman (also Thanad; Thai: ถนัด คอมันตร์; RTGS: Thanat Khoman, 9 May 1914 – 3 March 2016) was a Thai diplomat and politician. He was foreign minister from 1959 to 1971, leader of the Democrat Party from 1979 to 1982, and deputy prime minister from 1980 to 1983. He died at the age of 101 on 3 March 2016, a couple of months shy of his 102nd birthday.

== Early life ==
Thanat was born in Bangkok and came from a Thai Chinese family. His father, Phraya Phiphaksa Satayathipatai (Po Khoman) was one of Siam's first law school graduates and a judge on the Supreme Court of Thailand. Thanat attended Assumption College in Bangkok, before he went to France, graduating from a Bordeaux lycée. Supplied with a scholarship from the Thai foreign ministry, he continued his studies in Bordeaux and Paris, earning degrees from the Institute of Higher International Studies (IHEI) and Sciences Po in 1939, as well as a doctor of law degree from the University of Paris in 1940.

== Diplomatic career ==
After his return to Thailand, Thanat was obliged to join the diplomatic service, as the foreign ministry had financed his studies. During World War II he was stationed as a second secretary at the Thai embassy in Tokyo from 1941 to 1943. During this time, the Thai-Japanese agreement of 1942 was concluded, allowing Japanese troops to march through Thailand and use it as a base for attacks on British Burma and Malaya and leading to Thailand's entry into the war on the Axis side. However, Thanat disagreed with what was perceived as a virtual Japanese occupation of Thailand and joined the Seri Thai ("Free Thai") resistance movement that was supported by the British Force 136 and the American OSS. In February 1945, he was a member of a secret delegation to the Allied South East Asia Command in Kandy, Ceylon.

After the Second World War, he held a number of diplomatic posts, including chargé d'affaires at the Thai embassies in Washington, D.C., and Delhi. In 1950 he was chosen as the chairman of the UN Economic Commission for Asia and the Far East (ECAFE) in New York City. From 1952 to 1957 he served as the deputy to the Permanent Representative from Thailand to the United Nations. In 1957 he was promoted to the post of the Ambassador of Thailand to the United States.

== Political career ==
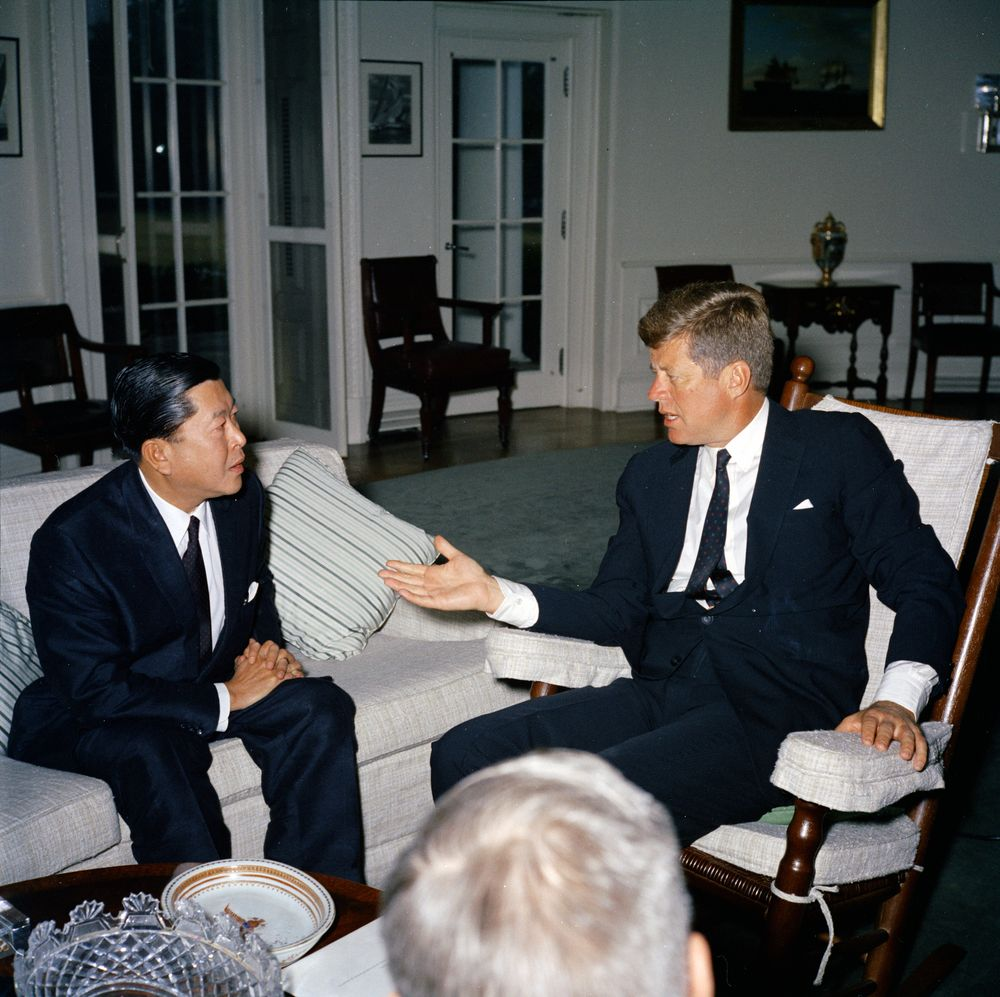
Thanat Khoman with United States President John F. Kennedy at the White House, 1961

On 10 February 1959, he was appointed Minister of Foreign Affairs of Thailand in the government of authoritarian Prime Minister Sarit Thanarat. His major contribution was in promoting regional reconciliation and cooperation in Southeast Asia. He was a participant in SEATO talks in 1961. In March 1962 he signed a joint communiqué with United States Secretary of State Dean Rusk in which the United States promised Thailand support and defense against potential communist aggression. Despite being only an informal protocol, it was celebrated in Thailand as a bilateral pact of the two countries, dubbed the Thanat–Rusk Communiqué.

In the 1960s Thanat played a key role in mediating between Indonesia and Malaysia. The choice of Bangkok as the founding place of the Association of Southeast Asian Nations on 8 August 1967 was an expression of respect for his active role in the formation of this institution. On 17 November 1971 he resigned his post after a coup d'état.

After his resignation as foreign minister, Thanat entered national politics in 1979 and served as chairman of the Democrat Party until 1982. Between 1980 and 1982 he was also deputy prime minister in the government of Prem Tinsulanonda. In 1982 he retired from political life. He celebrated his 100th birthday in 2014. His wife, Molee, is a maternal granddaughter of Tan Kim Ching.

== Honours ==
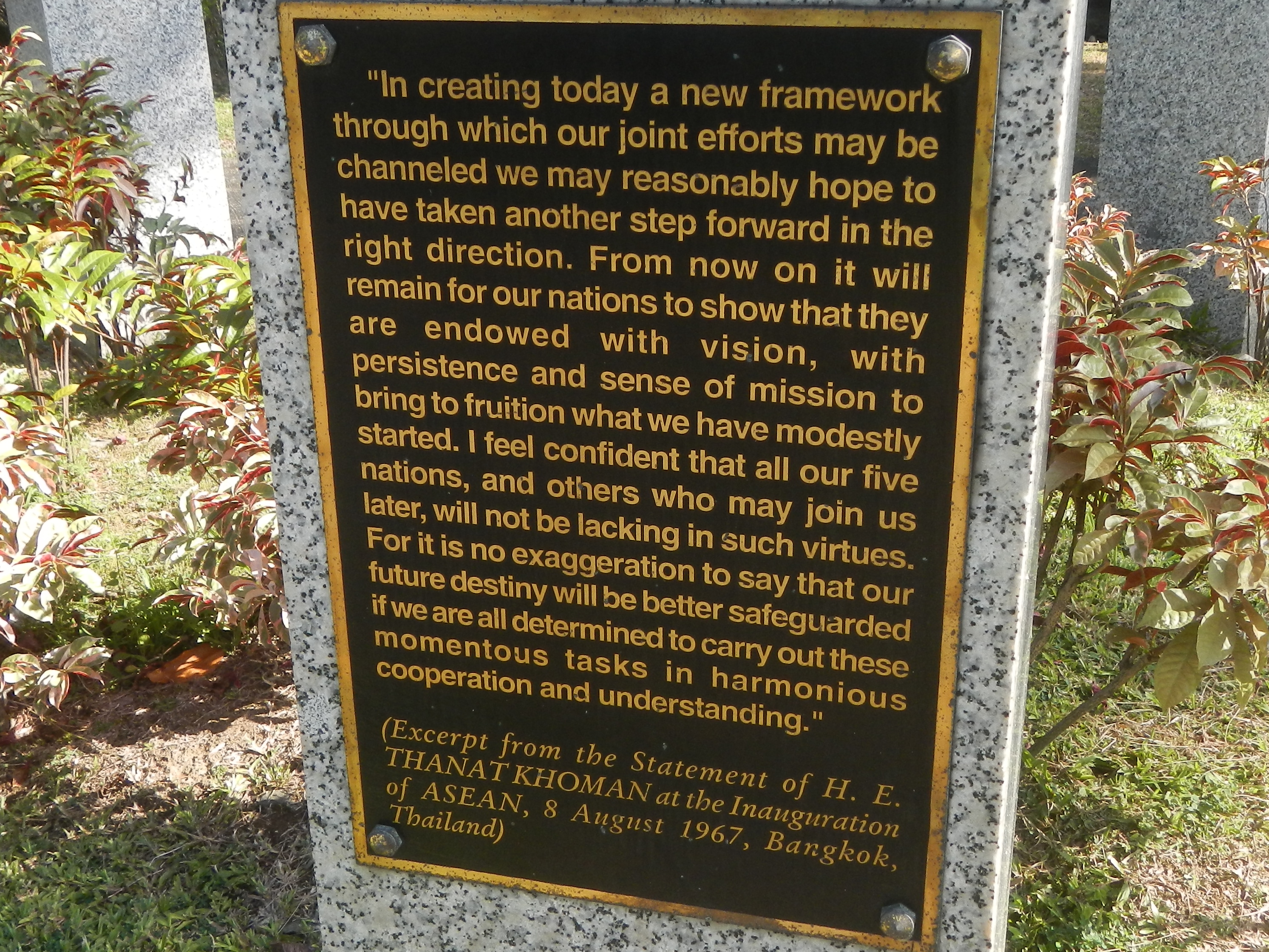
Bust of Thanat Khoman at the ASEAN Garden with the excerpt from his statement at the inauguration of ASEAN.

=== Thai Decorations ===
- 1968 – Knight Grand Cross of the Order of Chula Chom Klao
- 1968 – Knight Grand Cordon of the Order of the White Elephant
- 1960 – Knight Grand Cordon of the Most Noble Order of the Crown of Thailand
- 1966 – Dushdi Mala Civilian, arts and sciences (Silpa Vidhya)
- 1942 – Medal for Service in the Interior - Indochina
- 1963 – Border Service Medal
- 1966 – Chakrabarti Mala Medal
- 1960 – King Rama IX Royal Cypher Medal 2nd

=== Foreign Honours ===
- Spain:
  - 1960 – Knight Grand Cross of the Order of Isabella the Catholic
- United Kingdom:
  - 1961 – Honorary Knight Grand Cross of the Order of St Michael and St George (GCMG)
- Germany:
  - 1961 – Grand Cross 1st Class of the Order of Merit of the Federal Republic of Germany
- Portugal:
  - 1961 – Grand Cross of the Order of Christ
- Denmark:
  - 1961 – Grand Cross of the Order of the Dannebrog
- Norway:
  - 1961 – Grand Cross of the Order of St. Olav
- Sweden:
  - 1961 – Commander Grand Cross of the Order of the Polar Star
- Italy:
  - 1961 – Knight Grand Cross of the Order of Merit of the Italian Republic
- Vatican City:
  - 1961 – Knight Grand Cross of the Order of Pope Pius IX
- Belgium:
  - 1961 – Grand Cordon of the Ordre de Leopold
- France:
  - 1961 – Grand Cross of the Legion of Honour
- Luxembourg:
  - 1961– Grand Cross of the Order of the Oak Crown
- Malaya:
  - 1962 – Honorary Grand Commander of the Order of the Defender of the Realm
- Japan:
  - 1963 – Grand Cordon 1st Class of the Order of the Rising Sun
- (Kingdom of Greece) Greece:
  - 1963 – Grand Cross of the Royal Order of George I
- Taiwan:
  - 1963 – Special Grand Cordon of the Order of Brilliant Star
  - 1963 – Special Grand Cordon of the Order of Propitious Clouds
- South Vietnam:
  - 1964 – Kim Khanh Decoration, First Class
- South Korea:
  - 1966 – Recipient of the Order of Service Merit, 1st Class
- (Ethiopian Empire) Ethiopia:
  - 1967 – Knight Grand Cross of the Order of Menelik II
- Brazil:
  - 1967 – Grand Cross of the Order of the Southern Cross
- Mexico:
  - 1967 – Sash of the Order of the Aztec Eagle
- Austria:
  - 1969 – Grand Star of the Decoration of Honour for Services to the Republic of Austria
- Philippines:
  - 1998 – Grand Cross of the Order of Sikatuna
  - 2017 – Grand Collar of the Order of Lakandula (posthumous)

== See also ==
- Grand Marshals of the Rose Parade
