= San Francisco System =

Network of alliances

- Type: Alliance network
- Founded: 1951

The San Francisco System (also known as the "Hub and Spokes" architecture) is a network of alliances pursued by the United States in the Asia-Pacific region, after the end of World War II – the United States as a "hub", and Japan, South Korea, Taiwan, the Philippines, Thailand, Australia, and New Zealand (and historically, also South Vietnam) as "spokes". The system is made of bilateral political-military and economic commitments between the United States and its Asia-Pacific allies. This system stands in contrast to a multilateral alliance, such as NATO.

Initially, the United States sought to establish a multilateral alliance among its allies in the Asia-Pacific region, but the American allies in the Asia-Pacific region were unwilling or ambivalent about entering into a multilateral alliance. As a consequence, the United States opted for the hub-and-spokes architecture, a set of bilateral alliances.

== History ==
The hub-and-spokes system, with the United States as the "hub" and no apparent connections between the "spokes" allowed the United States to exert hegemonistic influence over the smaller allies of the Asia-Pacific region. The legacy of the system continues to today, represented by the absence of the multilateral security architecture in the region like NATO. Some argue that the reason why the hub-and-spoke network remains viable today is because its focus moved from regional concerns to those of the global such as the war on terror and issues dealing with weapons of mass destruction.

=== Post Korean War ===
Right after World War II, the United States was not interested in being involved in the Asia-Pacific region and was more concentrated in its role in Europe. However after the Korean War, the United States became more engaged in the Asia-Pacific region.

=== Bilateral agreements of the 1950s ===
As the Cold War escalated, the United States started building military alliances in the Asia-Pacific region. It moved to sign a Mutual Defense Treaty with the Philippines in August 1951. Thereafter, a series of defense treaties were signed: the Security Treaty with Australia and New Zealand in September 1951, the Mutual Defense Treaty with the South Korea in October 1953, the Mutual Defense Treaty with the Republic of China in December 1954, and the Security Treaty with Japan in January 1960. Thanat–Rusk communiqué between US and Thailand was agreed in March 1962, though not a mutual defense treaty. The hub-spokes systems was formed upon these treaties.

Victor Cha proposed a reason for the United States's choice for a bilateral structure with the powerplay theory. The underlying idea came from the domino theory – that if one country falls into communism, others will follow. He defines powerplay as "the construction of an asymmetric alliance designed to exert maximum control over the smaller allies in the region that might engage in aggressive behavior against adversaries that could entrap the United States into an unwanted war." Cha argued, the hub and spokes system allowed the United States to not only contain the threat posed by the Soviet Union but also acquire exclusive power over the Asia-Pacific region. However, the United States feared entrapment in an unwanted war; a way to restrain these rogue allies was therefore needed. The treaty contained South Korean President Syngman Rhee's ambitions to annex the North. Another anti-communist, authoritarian ally was Chiang Kai-Shek. His ambition to reconquer Mainland China also heightened the US fear of entrapment in a prolonged conflict. Hence, the mutual defense treaty was limited to the region of Taiwan Strait instead of the whole claimed territory of Chiang's government. Another reason for bilateral agreements in the region was to prevent the revival of Japanese aggression and Japan's economic recovery at the same time, in order for it to become a growth engine of the region by giving enough economic opportunity (a direct contrast to the Treaty of Versailles between the Allies of World War I and Germany, which forced Germany to compensate for the massive destruction it had caused, leading to its early failure).

=== Multilateralism ===
However, over the years, Asia-Pacific nations began to recognize the value of multilateralism and began forming indigenous multilateral economic connections, which the United States is not a member of, such as the ARF (1994) and ASEAN. The 1997 Asian financial crisis caused some regional states to realize the importance of an "exit/entry option" for regional economic stability aside from the United States. This has been characterized as a challenge to the hub-and-spokes system led by the United States, as the nations in the region increased their interactions with China, making the bilateral alliances as a hedging option. According to a 2020 study, the United States wanted a multilateral alliance in the Asia-Pacific region rather than the hub-and-spokes architecture.

== Rationale ==
The hub-and-spokes system is a highly asymmetric alliance by nature in both security and economic dimensions, offering military protection and economic access through trade rather than aid. The system can best be explained through the lens of the security-autonomy tradeoff model. The model accounts for asymmetrical alliance ties involving states of different power status than for symmetric alliance bonds. An asymmetric alliance is a contract in which the major power takes on the responsibility for a minor country's security by pledging to support it in the contingency of military conflict. In return, the major power gains autonomy or influence over the minor power's foreign policy decision-making process. The rationale for entering this system, for minor powers, is the interest in alliances to increase security from military aggression. The major power may be interested in alliances with the minor powers not to defend its own territory, but to extend its sphere of military and foreign influence.

However, as the Asia-Pacific region has grown in its own wealth and power, countries that had been under the asymmetric protection of the United States have increasingly faced calls to contribute more to their own defense. Talks between the US and South Korea and Japan are ongoing, but both countries have pledged to at least marginally increase their funding for US troop deployments within their borders.

== Japan ==
The nature of the relationship was a bit different with Japan from other Asia-Pacific countries. The United States viewed Japan as a possible great power in East Asia. Thus, the United States constructed the strongest defense treaty with Japan. The United States wanted Japan to be more involved and share the burden in peace keeping in Asia. However, the Yoshida Doctrine shows that Japan did not share the same ideas.

In early 2024, Prime Minister Fumio Kishida of Japan undertook a series of decisions to significantly reposition the defense posture of Japan. Publicly referring to a "historic turning point" due to the rise of geopolitical tensions across multiple continents, Kishida has committed to a meaningful break with Japan's strictly pacifist post-war stance. This is only the latest round in the long history of Japan's wrangling over its externally imposed post-war Constitution, particularly Article 9, which compels Japan to forswear warfare.

== See also ==
- Mutual Defense Treaty (United States–Philippines)
- ANZUS
- Security Treaty between the United States and Japan
- Mutual Defense Treaty (United States–South Korea)
- Sino-American Mutual Defense Treaty
- Thanat–Rusk Communiqué
