= Manifold (prediction market) =

Online reputation-based prediction market

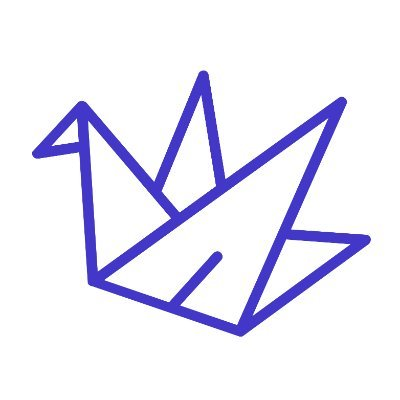
- Available in: English
- Founded: December 2021; 4 years ago
- Founders: Austin Chen, James Grugett, Stephen Grugett
- Website: manifold.markets
- Current status: Active

Manifold, formerly known as Manifold Markets, is an online prediction market platform. Users engage in competitive forecasting using play money called 'Mana'. Topics on Manifold have included the 2024 United States presidential election and the Oscars, but markets can be created by any user and can cover topics as specific as "whether a particular user will read War and Peace this year".

== History ==
Manifold was founded in December 2021 by Austin Chen and brothers James and Stephen Grugett. Stephen Grugett is the current CEO of the organization.

Manifold received seed funding from the Astral Codex Ten grant program. It has since received $1.5 million in funding from the FTX Future Fund, and over $340,000 from the Survival and Flourishing Fund.

In September 2023, Manifold hosted Manifest, a forecasting conference, in Berkeley, California. The conference was hosted again in 2024, 2025 and 2026. Attendees have included Nate Silver, Robin Hanson, Richard Hanania, Eliezer Yudkowsky, Destiny, and Scott Alexander, along with Shayne Coplan and Tarek Mansour.

== Market structure ==
The website uses a play money currency called Mana. Markets use a version of the Uniswap automated market maker, known as "maniswap".

== See also ==
- Polymarket
- Kalshi
- Metaculus
- PredictIt
