= Luana Lopes Lara =

Brazilian entrepreneur

- Born: May 20, 1996 (age 30)
- Education: Massachusetts Institute of Technology (BS)
- Known for: Co-founder of Kalshi; Youngest self-made female billionaire

Luana Lopes Lara (born 1996) is a Brazilian entrepreneur who is the chief operating officer (COO) of the online prediction market site Kalshi, which she co-founded with Tarek Mansour. She has a net worth of about $2.6 billion at the age of 29 in 2026, making her the youngest female billionaire and joining the list of America's and Brazil's richest and youngest self-made women according to Forbes.

== Early life and education ==
Lara was born in Belo Horizonte, Brazil, on May 20, 1996. For eight years she attended a Bolshoi Ballet Academy in Joinville, before being engaged in a production of Swan Lake at the Salzburger Landestheater in Austria for a few months. According to Forbes, Lara won a gold medal in the Brazilian Astronomy Olympiad and bronze in the Santa Catarina Mathematics Olympiad during her youth.

She attended the Massachusetts Institute of Technology, from which she graduated with a degree in computer science in 2018. While a student at MIT, Lara interned at Bridgewater Associates and Citadel Securities, working as a quantitative trader.

== Career ==
In 2018, Lara founded Kalshi with Tarek Mansour, whom she met while the two were students at MIT. Following multiple rounds of venture capital funding led by Paradigm totaling more than $1 billion in volume in late 2025, Kalshi was valued at $11 billion.

In December 2025, Forbes reported that Lara became the world's youngest self-made woman billionaire at age 29, displacing previous titleholder Scale AI-cofounder Lucy Guo. Her net worth, estimated to be about $2.6 billion largely derives from her 12% stake in Kalshi.

In 2024, Kalshi received federal approval to offer contracts on U.S. presidential elections. It was the first time in more than a century that such trading had been legally permitted in the United States.

== See also ==
- List of Massachusetts Institute of Technology alumni
