= FameLeague =

Gamification technology platform

FameLeague (Fantasy Market League) is a gamification technology platform which drives fantasy stock market web applications for sports, people and show business. Licensees can customize FameLeague to create their own fantasy market games. It was the first flagship product of Gametize (formerly Socialico), a Singapore-based startup founded by Keith Ng and Damon Widjaja. It was a simulated stock exchange and a prediction market web application with more than 100,000 registered users. FameLeague adds gaming mechanics to prediction speculations, a concept also known as gamification, though that term is not commonly used in 2009.

FameLeague's technology enable users to speculate and purchase shares of predictions, with each potential outcome of a prediction being a stock. With each accurate prediction stock invested, users stand to earn points. Likewise, users also earn points when the popularity of a prediction increases. The reverse is also true; users will lose points for wrong predictions, or when a dip in popularity occurs for the user's chosen prediction. FameLeague mimics the behaviour of actual stock markets, but in a highly simplified form.

== History ==
FameLeague was a simulated stock exchange and a prediction market web application integrated with popular social media website, Facebook. It was inaugurated as a beta release in April 2009, and went live on November 16, 2009. Prior to its revamp, it had more than 20,000 registered users. It was a top 50 finalist in the fbFund 2009 – a $10M seed fund offered to support developers and entrepreneurs working on the Facebook platform. It is the only Singaporean startup, and one of three others in Asia to receive this honour. It has been featured on print media such as The Straits Times and ChannelNewsAsia and blogs such as SG Entrepreneurs, E27 and Young Upstarts.

In the FameLeague, the player and the members of his/her social network were listed as stocks that could be purchased by others as shares. Shares on popular media such as music, movies and celebrities could also be traded. Like the actual stock exchange, the market price of a stock was determined by the number of shares traded for that stock. On top of that, prediction stock – or stock that specifies a possible outcome to an ongoing or future event – could also be traded, and their market prices depended on the expected outcome. The objective of the game was to earn as much Silver - the main currency in FameLeague - as possible, by making accurate forecasts while purchasing prediction stocks, and through the ability to anticipate which stocks would become more popular on FameLeague when purchasing stock on friends, celebrities or media.

In May 2010, the management made a strategic decision to segment the broad-based game into individual products such as FameMark, a fantasy game for trading shares of people with a dating angle, and PremierX, a fantasy stock exchange for English Premier League. FameLeague was then developed into a generic technology engine that drives these segmented products upon customization. These three products (FameLeague, FameMark, PremierX) have been stalled in developments.

In February 2012, the company has become a full-fledged cloud-based gamification platform, initially a side project code-named 'GameMaki' and later branded as Gametize. Along with this, the company also rebranded from 'Socialico' to 'Gametize'. Today, Gametize is an enterprise gamification platform for organizations to engage their target audience and motivate for target behaviors, such as in marketing, learning, and training. It engages and motivates behaviors with challenges such as quizzes, photo, QR code challenges. Users can earn rewards, compete, and socialize through a mobile/web experience that can be white-labeled and published in 5 minutes. The technology is used by major brands and enterprises such as Shell, DBS, Samsung, and P&G. It has registered than 800,000 users, with more than 20 million challenge completions. Gametize was selected as Singapore's 20 hottest startups by Singapore Business Review magazine in 2015. Recently in July 2023, Gametize won an innovation award for gamifying sustainability efforts with URA, IMDA, and Science Centre.

== See also ==
- Prediction market
- Stock market simulator
- Virtual economy
- Simulated reality
- Social simulation
- Gamification
