= Gregory P. Laughlin =

American astrophysicist

Gregory Laughlin
- Years active: 1994-present

Gregory P. Laughlin is an American astrophysicist who is a professor of astronomy and astrophysics at Yale University. As a researcher, he is interested in hydrodynamic simulations, the characterization of extrasolar planets and planet-forming environments as well as the far future of the Universe. He has also published a paper on high-frequency trading and was involved in market prediction in 2014.

== Education ==
He received his Ph.D. in Astronomy and Astrophysics from UC Santa Cruz in 1994. He held an NSF/JSPS Fellowship in Tokyo and also did postdoctoral research at the University of Michigan and the UC Berkeley.

== Career ==
From 1999-2001, he worked for NASA as a Planetary Scientist at the Ames Research Center in California.

In 1997, Laughlin published a 57-page paper in Reviews of Modern Physics about the far future of the universe that made the front page of the New York Times. This paper became the inspiration of the book The Five Ages of the Universe, which he wrote along with Fred Adams.

He joined the UC Santa Cruz faculty in 2001. In 2004, he was recipient of an NSF CAREER award, and was promoted to Full Professor in 2007.

In 2009, Laughlin calculated a value Earth at $5 quadrillion dollars to show a message of how precious the is and to not destroy it.

In 2014, he published a paper on high-frequency trading, showing that even if a trader won only 51% of trades, they would be guaranteed to make a profit if they made enough trades. Next year in 2015, he co-founded the aggregated prediction platform Metaculus with Anthony Aguirre.
