= Uffindell =

Uffindell is a surname. Notable people with the surname include:

- Ben Uffindell, New Zealand political satirist
- Sam Uffindell (born 1983), New Zealand politician
