= Shayne Coplan =

American businessman (born 1998)

- Coplan in 2026
- Born: June 14, 1998 (age 28); New York City, U.S.
- Education: New York University (attended)
- Years active: 2020–present
- Known for: Founder and CEO of Polymarket

Shayne Coplan (born 1998) is an American entrepreneur and technologist best known as the founder and chief executive officer (CEO) of Polymarket, a cryptocurrency-based prediction market. In October 2025, he became the world's youngest self-made billionaire, according to the Bloomberg Billionaires Index, with an estimated net worth of $1.0 billion, according to Forbes.

== Early life ==
Shayne Coplan was born in 1998 to South African parents. They were both college professors; his father studied psychological disorders, and his mother taught in New York University's film department. Coplan's parents separated when he was young. He was raised on the Upper West Side of Manhattan by his mother, and attended public schools in Hell's Kitchen, including The Beacon School.

As a teenager, Coplan learned computer programming. He participated in the initial coin offering of Ethereum in 2014, and acquired it when it cost around $0.30 per token. This early investment introduced him to the world of cryptocurrency and provided seed funding for his future ventures. Coplan studied computer science at New York University, but left during his freshman year to pursue his growing interest in blockchain technology and prediction markets.

== Career ==
Coplan's first crypto-based project was TokenUnion, a loyalty program that rewarded users for holding specific tokens. When the COVID-19 pandemic struck in 2020, he pivoted to focus entirely on prediction markets, inspired by economist Friedrich Hayek's theories on decentralized information and by professor Robin Hanson's concept of futarchy (governance by prediction markets). In early 2019, he even wrote to Hanson expressing his ambition to "bring prediction markets to life", though Hanson was skeptical after having seen many such attempts fail. Working alone from his Lower East Side apartment, Coplan founded Polymarket in June 2020 at age 22.

Polymarket gained early traction during the 2020 United States presidential election by correctly signaling the victory of Joe Biden weeks before Election Day. The platform's popularity grew quickly, attracting venture capital funding and high-profile backers. By 2024, Polymarket had raised about $70 million from investors, including Ethereum co-founder Vitalik Buterin and venture capitalist Peter Thiel. Statistician Nate Silver, founder of FiveThirtyEight, joined Polymarket as an advisor in 2024 after seeing its predictive success. In the lead-up to the 2024 United States presidential election, Polymarket foreshadowed several major developments, such as President Joe Biden's withdrawal from the race and Republican nominee Donald Trump's selection of JD Vance as his running mate. On election night, while most polls showed a toss-up, Polymarket's odds reflected Trump's victory over Democratic nominee Kamala Harris. According to Fortune, Polymarket was the site for roughly 85% of all online wagers on the outcome of the U.S. presidential election, and users traded $3 billion in predictions on the outcome.

Despite its rapid growth, Polymarket faced regulatory and ethical challenges. In 2022, the U.S. Commodity Futures Trading Commission (CFTC) fined Polymarket $1.4 million for operating an unregistered event-based trading platform, and the company agreed to geofence U.S. users under a cease-and-desist order until it obtained proper regulatory approval. In 2024, Fortune reported that as much as one-third of Polymarket's volume consisted of "wash trades" (where the same user trades with themselves to inflate activity). Polymarket declined to comment on that.

In November 2024, FBI agents searched Coplan's Manhattan home and seized his electronic devices as part of an investigation into whether Polymarket was illegally allowing Americans to bet on U.S. elections. Polymarket's spokesperson claimed the raid was "obvious political retribution" by the Biden administration for the site's having correctly predicted the election outcome. Coplan made light of the incident, quipping "New phone, who dis?" on social media after his phone was confiscated by agents. No charges were filed against him, and in July 2025 the U.S. Department of Justice and CFTC dropped their investigations into Polymarket without any further action.

With the regulatory cloud lifting, Coplan moved to expand Polymarket's reach. In September 2025, the company acquired a small CFTC-registered exchange and clearinghouse to secure a U.S. operating license, paving the way for Polymarket to resume service to U.S. customers by the end of 2025 after nearly three years of being barred domestically. In October 2025, the Intercontinental Exchange (parent company of the New York Stock Exchange) announced a deal to invest up to $2 billion in Polymarket, valuing the startup at $8 billion pre-money valuation. Coplan's roughly 11% ownership stake in the company translated to a personal net worth of about $1 billion, and Bloomberg.com identified him as the youngest self-made billionaire in the world at that time.

== Personal life ==
Outside of Polymarket, Coplan has been active in the digital art and crypto collectibles space. Under the pseudonym "ethsquiat", he amassed a large collection of NFT artwork during the crypto art boom of 2020–2021, and he is credited with discovering and mentoring emerging NFT artists such as FEWOCiOUS, who later became one of the industry's top-selling creators.
