= SportsHero =

Fantasy sports and prediction app

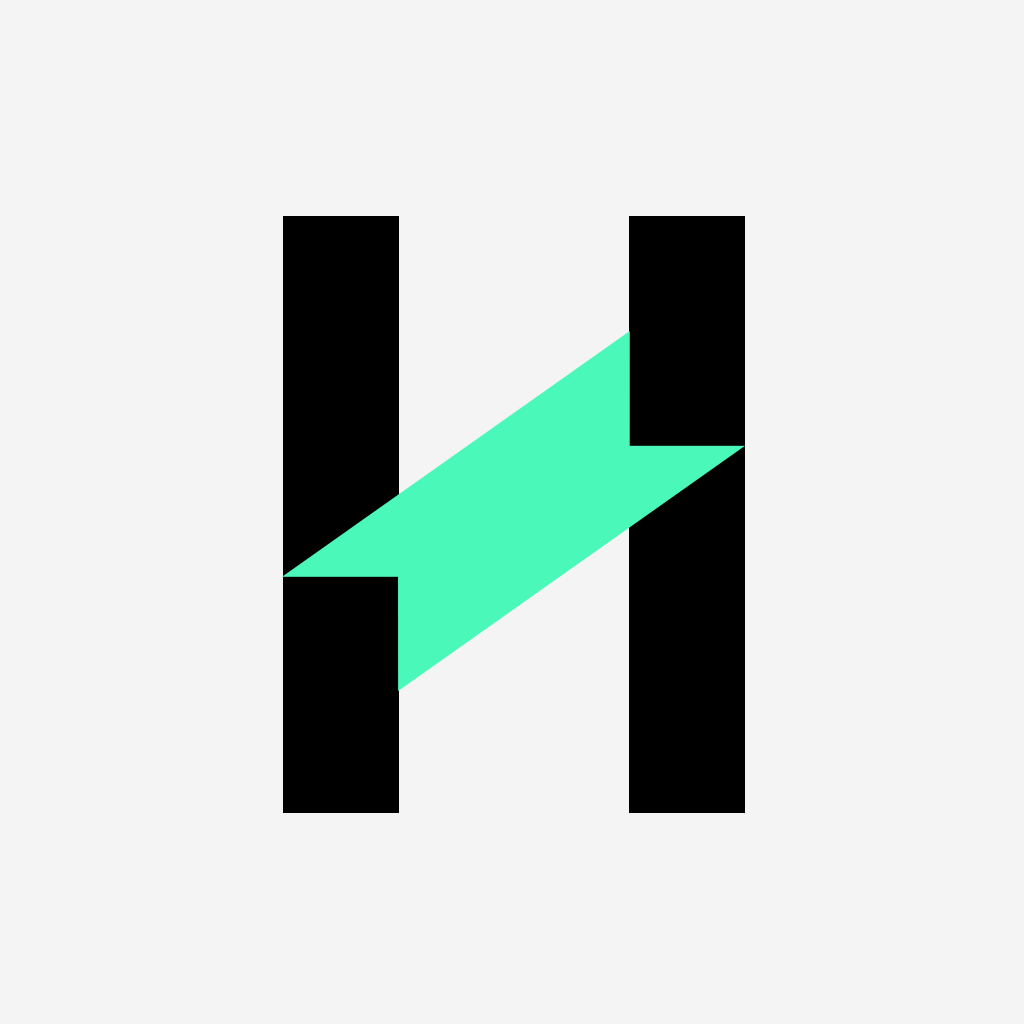
- Type: Private
- Industry: Prediction game, Fantasy sport
- Founded: 2016
- Headquarters: Singapore
- Key people: Tom Lapping (CEO) Mike Higginson (Chairman)
- Website: sportshero.live

SportsHero is a real-time fantasy sports app and social prediction platform. Within the app, users make predictions on match, game, competition results. These users are ranked based on information provided by other fans and experts in the community, as well as real-time news and statistics.

Football (soccer) and cricket are currently available on the app, with plans to introduce cycling and further keystone sports such as basketball, AFL, esports and American football. SportsHero is available as a mobile download for both iOS and Android devices.

== Background ==
SportsHero was launched by MyHero Pte Ltd, a Singapore-based mobile app developer, in May 2016. The app replaces FootballHero, which had a user base of over 250,000. Existing users prior to the launch of SportsHero were migrated over to the app.

SportsHero is based on the same model as TradeHero, a social investment network founded in 2013. It is a currency trading simulation app that allows stock-watchers spend and earn virtual credits buying and selling stocks on exchanges around the world. In May 2016, SportsHero received US$2.4 million in funding, led by Australia-based Nevada Iron Ltd. The latter company signed a Heads of Agreement with Sportz Hero Pty Ltd to acquire SportsHero.

In October 2017, SportsHero launched an enhanced brand identity and user experience. It upgraded the app to offer a free to play model for users across key markets whilst providing a pay to play model.

SportsHero can be download in 195 countries around the world and is available in three languages - Bahasa Indonesia, English and Mandarin.

In November 2017, WIRED Magazine UK rates SportsHero as one of the best iPhone apps of 2017.

== Partnerships and agreements ==
SportsHero partnered with Minute Media's 90Min over a three-year term on 17 October 2017. Under the deal, 90Min supplies SportsHero with original football content developed by 90Min editorial staff, fan contributors and football influencers, as well as gives access to Minute Media's community.

On 9 May 2018, SportsHero announced two Indonesian partners, Mr Tri Putra Permadi and PT Walletku Indompet Indonesia (Walletku). Indonesian IT, social network and telecommunications entrepreneur Mr Tri Putra Permadi is SportsHero's Official Indonesian Football Partner, while Walletku is the platforms technology partner that offers a payment platform and range of digital products, including prepaid mobile phone credit. Walletku's payment platform is integrated with SportsHero's Indonesian app to facilitate the sale of SportsHero tickets to Walletku's users wanting to participate in SportsHero's localised Indonesian competitions.

Global ambassadors

On 29 March 2017, Ian Chappell was appointed SportsHero's global cricket ambassador. Chappell captained the Australian Cricket team between 1971 and 1975 before taking a central role in the breakaway World Series Cricket organisation. Today he is a prominent sports journalist and cricket commentator.

== Patents ==
“Method, System And Computer Program To Broker The Monetized Broadcasts Of Users Through A Subscription Based Information Ecosystem” U.S. Patent 20150356559. Filed November 4, 2013, published December 10, 2015 (Dinesh Bhatia, Dominic Morris)
