= Trendio.com =

Trendio
- Type: Prediction Stock Market
- Website: http://www.trendio.com

Trendio.com was an online prediction game based in Stockholm, Sweden. Users, instead of buying stock in companies with real money, bought stock in certain news subjects with fake money. Words available included those from the world of politics, sport, and entertainment. The more the word appeared in the news, the higher the value of the stock. The site used about 3,000 online internet sources to gauge the value of each word. The site was available in both French and English. A new version of the site, designed by a Portuguese company, was released on December 6, 2006. Added features included a larger list of words, more contests, blogs, forums, private messages, and a completely redesigned look and feel.

== How it works ==
Users started with 10,000 Trendillions (currency of Trendio) in play money. They could then invest this money in the words available on the site. In December 2006 about 2500 words were available in 6 categories: news, politics, business, entertainment, sports and technology&science. New words were added regularly. The players were all ranked and could compare their results. Contests are also organized where the players started with a new portfolio and had to fill it with words from a specific selection, for example only sports words. In such contests the players competed against each other during the period of the competition, a few days up to one month. A criticism of the site was that it was "biased toward American sources."
