= The Civilian Party =

- Founder: Ben Uffindell
- Founded: 7 June 2013
- Dissolved: 5 May 2015
- Newspaper: The Civilian
- Ideology: Political satire
- Political position: Left-wing

Website
- www.thecivilianparty.org.nz

The Civilian Party was a frivolous political party founded by political satirist Ben Uffindell. It contested the 2014 New Zealand general election before disbanding. The party was deregistered at its own request on 5 May 2015.

== History ==
Uffindell, who finished a degree in political science at University of Canterbury in 2012, started The Civilian as a satirical New Zealand online newspaper in 2013. Uffindell claimed an average of 20,000–25,000 page views per day.

On 7 June 2013, The Civilian announced its intention to register a political party and to charge fifty cents as a membership fee. Prediction market iPredict listed a contract on 21 June 2013 measuring the likelihood of the registration of The Civilian Party before the 2014 general election.

Uffindell gave an interview as party leader on TV3's current-affairs television programme The Nation and outlined some of the party's policies, including:

- increased taxes for the poor and decreased taxes for the wealthy to disincentivise poverty
- giving a llama to every child living in poverty
- one free tub of ice cream for every citizen
- declaring national independence from the city of Hamilton

In June 2014 the party came under criticism for receiving $33,635 in political-party funding from the Electoral Commission. Prime Minister John Key commented that "the Civilian Party will be thinking the biggest joke's on us, the taxpayer", and the New Zealand Taxpayers' Union reacted negatively. However, party leader Ben Uffindell said that considering the party had asked for $1 million in funding, $33,000 was "a bad deal". He also pointed out: "There are other joke parties getting funding, like the Conservatives and ACT."

On 23 July 2014 the party applied to the Electoral Commission for registration. The party was formally registered on 11 August 2014.

The party received 1,096 votes (0.05%) in the 2014 general election.

The party was deregistered at its own request on 5 May 2015.

== Electoral results ==
Election	Candidates nominated		Seats won	Votes	Vote share %	Position	Status in government
Election	Electorate	List	Seats won	Votes	Vote share %	Position	Status in government
2014	0	8	0 / 121	1,096	0.05%	13th / 15	Unelected
