= Sociedade Astronômica Brasileira =

Brazilian Astronomical Society
- Sociedade Astronômica Brasileira
- Abbreviation: SAB
- Formation: 1974; 52 years ago
- Type: Scientific Society
- Headquarters: São Paulo, SP, Brazil
- Official language: Portuguese
- President: Helio Jaques Rocha Pinto
- Parent organization: Brazilian Society for the Progress of Science
- Website: www.sab-astro.org.br

The Brazilian Astronomical Society (in Portuguese: Sociedade Astronômica Brasileira - SAB) is a professional astronomical society in Brazil, founded in 1974.

According to its statute, the society is obliged to fulfill certain duties:

- Congregate Brazil's astronomers;
- Uphold the freedom to scientific research and education;
- Uphold astronomers' rights and interests;
- Support national science's prestige;
- Stimulate national astronomy's research and teaching;
- Maintain contact with similar institutes and societies, both national and abroad;
- Promote scientific meetings, courses and conferences;
- Publish and update a scientific bulletin about the society's activities and general news about astronomy.

In addition to symposia, working meetings and contact services, it also holds annual meetings, which have taken place in:

Numeral	Number	Location	Year	Ref
XIX	19th	Glória Hotel (Caxambu, MG)	1993	
XX	20th	Campos do Jordão (SP)	1994	
XXI	21st	Caxambu (MG)	1995	
XXII	22nd	São Lourenço (MG)	1996	
XXIII	23rd	Angra dos Reis (RJ)	1997	
XXIV	24th	Barra Bonita (SP)	1998	
XXV	25th	Caxambu (MG)	1999	
XXVI	26th	Portobello Hotel (Mangaratiba, RJ)	2000	
XXVII	27th	Grande Hotel (Águas de São Pedro, SP)	2001	
XXVIII	28th	Florianópolis (SC)	2002	
XXIX	29th	São Pedro (SP)	2003	
XXX	30th	Fonte Colina Verde Farm-Hotel (São Pedro, SP)	2004	
XXXI	31st	Vacance Hotel (Águas de Lindóia, SP)	2005	
XXXII	32nd	Village Eldorado Hotel (Atibaia, SP)	2006	
XXXIII	33rd	Recanto das Hortênsias Hotel (Passa Quatro, MG)	2007	
XXXIV	34th	Recanto das Hortênsias Hotel (Passa Quatro, MG)	2008	
XXXV	35th	Recanto das Hortênsias Hotel (Passa Quatro, MG)	2010	
XXXVI	36th	Majestic Hotel (Águas de Lindóia, SP)	2011	
XXXVII	37th	Majestic Hotel (Águas de Lindóia, SP)	2012	
XXXVIII	38th	Atlântico Búzios Convention & Resort (Armação dos Búzios, RJ)	2014	
XXXIX	39th	Metallurgical Park Augusto Barbosa (Ouro Preto, MG)	2015	
XL	40th	Ribeirão Preto (SP)	2016	
XLI	41st	São Paulo (SP)	4–8 September 2017	
XLII	42nd	Universidade Cruzeiro do Sul - Campus Anália Franco, São Paulo (SP)	9–12 July 2018	

== Teaching commission ==
The Brazilian Astronomical Society Teaching Commission (Comissão de Ensino da Sociedade Astronômica Brasileira - CESAB) is assigned to analyze and correct educational books' potential inaccuracies on astronomy, in cooperation with the Ministry of Education (Ministério da Educação - MEC). The commission is also responsible for the organizing of the Brazilian Astronomy Olympiad and the periodic realization of astronomy courses destinated for teachers, in addition to the frequent production and publishing of articles and texts with the objective to promote and teach astronomy, such as the Brazilian Astronomy Magazine (Revista Brasileira de Astronomia - RBA), published quarterly.

== See also ==
- List of Brazilian scientific societies associated with the SBPC
