= Anthony Aguirre =

American cosmologist

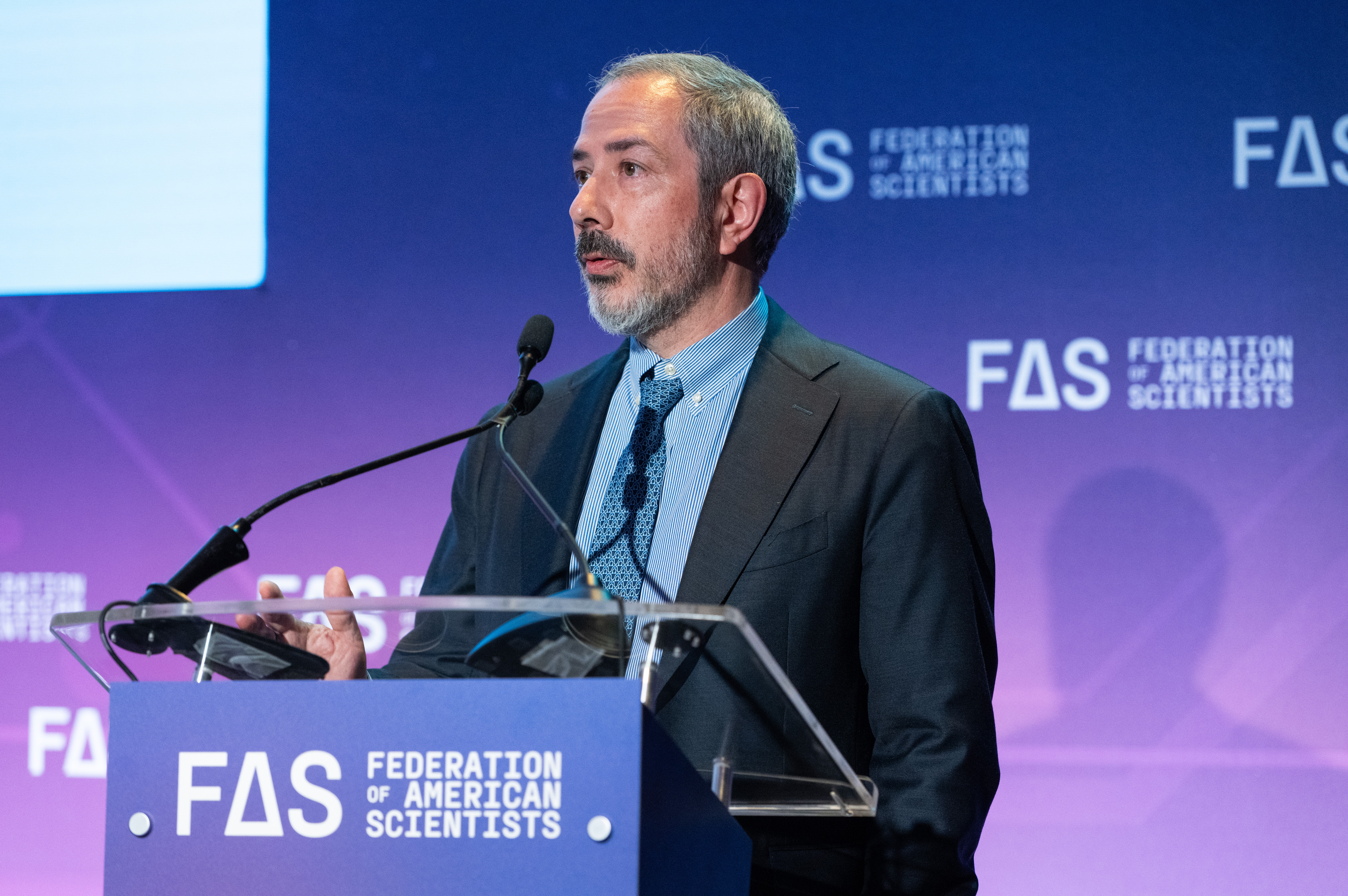
- Anthony Aguirre speaking at the Federation of American Scientists in 2026
- Born: July 23, 1973 (age 53)
- Scientific career
- Fields: Cosmology, physics
- Workplaces: UC Santa Cruz
- Thesis: Intergalactic dust and metals in cosmology (2000)
- Doctoral advisors: Lars Hernquist, David Layzer

Anthony Aguirre (born 1973) is an American theoretical cosmologist. Aguirre is an adjunct professor of physics at the University of California, Santa Cruz. He is the co-founder and CEO of the Future of Life Institute. He is also the co-founder and president of the Foundational Questions Institute. In 2015, he co-founded the aggregated prediction platform Metaculus with Greg Laughlin. In 2019, he published the pop science book Cosmological Koans.

== Early life and education ==
Aguirre was born on July 23, 1973. He received a B.S. in Mathematics/Physics from Brown University in 1995, an M.S. in Astronomy from Harvard University in 1998 and a Ph.D. in Astronomy from Harvard University.

== Career ==
His research has focused on various topics in theoretical physics, including the early universe, inflation, the foundations of quantum mechanics, foundations of statistical mechanics, gravitational physics, first stars, the intergalactic medium, galaxy formation, and black holes.

Together with Max Tegmark he developed the cosmological interpretation of quantum mechanics.

On March 5, 2025, Aguirre published Keep The Future Human: Why and How We Should Close the Gates to AGI and Superintelligence, and What We Should Build Instead, an extended essay that proposes a scheme for the international regulation of artificial intelligence. On November 6, 2025, he published another extended essay, "Control Inversion", arguing that artificial superintelligence would be "fundamentally uncontrollable" by humans.

== In the media ==
- Aguirre appears in the How Vast is the Cosmos? part of the Closer to Truth PBS series.
- Aguirre appears on the show Horizon, in the episode "How Big is the Universe?"
- Aguirre also appears in the episode "Living in a Parallel Universe" of the Naked Science documentary series on the National Geographic Channel.
- Aguirre was a guest on Sean M. Carroll’s Mindscape podcast, which was released on June 17, 2019 under the title of "Cosmology, Zen, Entropy, and Information".
- Aguirre was interviewed in the season 4 of Through the Wormhole, episode 3 ("Can We Survive the Death of the Sun?")
- In 2022, Aguirre appeared in the Netflix documentary A Trip to Infinity, discussing the mathematical implications of infinity.
- In 2022, Aguirre participated as a panelist at the Nobel Week Dialogue in Stockholm, organized by the Nobel Prize Foundation, where he took part in discussions entitled "Futurism & Utopian/Dystopian Visions" and "Living with Technology" alongside Nobel laureates, including Serge Haroche and Stuart J. Russell.
- In 2025 Aguirre participated in an episode of the Big Technology Podcast hosted by Alex Kantrowitz, where he discussed whether our push toward increasingly autonomous, general systems puts control out of reach.
- In 2025, Aguirre appeared at Axios House at SXSW in Austin, Texas, in a "View From the Top" conversation with Axios publisher Nicholas Johnston, where he discussed FLI's campaign to halt the development of AGI and his essay "Keep the Future Human."
- In 2025, Aguirre was interviewed on the For Humanity: An AI Risk Podcast in an episode titled "Keep the Future Human," where he discussed his four essential measures for ensuring a human-centered AI future and FLI's strategy for spending its resources.
- In 2025, Aguirre participated in the Tech & AI Forum at UNGA80 organized by Foreign Policy in New York City, where he took part in a panel called "Safeguarding the Future: Coordinated Approaches to Global AI Policy", alongside international policymakers and technology leaders.
- In 2026, Aguirre appeared at SXSW in Austin, Texas, in a fireside chat with tech ethicist Tristan Harris called "How We Could Lose Control: Avoiding the Paths to Runaway AI," where they discussed the real mechanisms by which humanity could be sidelined by its own AI creations.
