= Metaculus =

Online prediction aggregation engine

Metaculus Inc.
- Metaculus front page
- Company type: Benefit corporation
- Available in: English
- Founded: 2015; 11 years ago
- Headquarters: Santa Cruz, California, United States
- Area served: Worldwide
- Founders: Anthony Aguirre; Max Wainwright; Greg Laughlin
- CEO: Deger Turan
- Employees: 25 (2023)
- Website: metaculus.com
- Registration: Optional
- Current status: Active

Metaculus is an American reputation-based, massive online prediction solicitation and aggregation engine. One of the focuses of Metaculus is predicting the timing, nature and impact of scientific and technological advances and breakthroughs.

== Reward system ==
Three types of predictions can be made: probability predictions to binary questions that resolve as either 'yes' or 'no', numerical-range predictions, and date-range predictions. Users can contribute to the community prediction for any given question, leave comments and discuss prediction strategies with other users. Users can suggest new questions which, after moderation, will be opened to the community.

Users can earn points for successful predictions (or lose points for unsuccessful predictions), and track their own predictive progress. The scoring awards points both for being right and for being more right than the community.

In January 2020, Metaculus introduced the Bentham Prize, which awards bi-weekly monetary prizes of $300, $200 and $100 to the first, second and third most valuable user contributions. The following month, Metaculus introduced the Li Wenliang prize, which awards a number of different monetary prizes to questions, forecasts and analyses related to the COVID-19 outbreak.

== History ==
Data scientist Max Wainwright and physicists Greg Laughlin and Anthony Aguirre launched the site in 2015. In June 2017, the Metaculus Prediction was launched, which is a system for aggregating user predictions. The Metaculus Prediction, on average, outperforms the median of the community's predictions when evaluated using the Brier or Log scoring rules.

In 2021, Metaculus received an Effective altruism infrastructure fund grant worth $300k. In 2022, Metaculus received a $5.5m grant from Open Philanthropy. In October 2022, Metaculus received $20k funding from the FTX future fund, 3 weeks before the bankruptcy of FTX.

In 2022 the organization announced it reached 1,000,000 individual predictions, and that it was restructured as a public-benefit corporation, it is committed to the following goals, its new charter compels it to report annually on its progress in achieving these goals:

1. Fostering the growth, learning, and development of the forecasting and forecasting research communities.
2. Supporting stakeholders who are serving the public good by informing their decision making.
3. Increasing public access to information regarding forecasts of public interest.

In 2024, Metaculus rewrote their website code and released it under the BSD-2-Clause License.

== See also ==
- Superforecasting: The Art and Science of Prediction
- Iowa Electronic Markets
- PredictIt
- Prediction market
- Futarchy
