= The Five Ages of the Universe =

Book by Fred Adams

The Five Ages of the Universe: Inside the Physics of Eternity
- Cover
- Author: Fred Adams and Gregory Laughlin
- Language: English
- Genre: Popular science
- Publisher: Free Press Publishers
- Publication date: 1999
- Publication place: United States
- Media type: Print
- Pages: 251 pp.
- ISBN: 978-0-684-86576-8
- OCLC: 44402328

The Five Ages of the Universe is a popular science book written by astrophysicists Fred Adams and Gregory P. Laughlin about the future of an expanding universe first published in 1999.

== Book contents ==
The book The Five Ages of the Universe discusses the history, present state, and probable future of the universe, according to cosmologists' current understanding. The book divides the timeline of the universe into five eras: the Primordial Era, the Stelliferous Era, the Degenerate Era, the Black Hole Era and the Dark Era.

In addition to explaining current cosmological theory, the authors speculate on what kinds of life might exist in future eras of the universe. The speculation is based on a scaling hypothesis, credited to Freeman Dyson, the idea being, that all other things being equal the rate of metabolism—and therefore rate of consciousness—of an organism should be in direct proportion to the temperature at which that organism thrives. The authors envision life forms completely different from the biochemical ones of Earth, for example, based on networked black holes.

== Ages ==
The time scales treated in the book are sufficiently vast, that, the authors find it convenient to use scientific notation. They refer to the "n^{th} cosmological decade," meaning 10^{n} years after the Big Bang. In what follows, n refers to the cosmological decade.

=== Primordial Era ===
The Primordial Era is defined as "−50 < n < 5". In this era, the Big Bang, the subsequent inflation, and Big Bang nucleosynthesis are thought to have taken place. Toward the end of this age, the recombination of electrons with nuclei made the universe transparent for the first time. The authors discuss the horizon and flatness problems.

=== Stelliferous Era ===
The Stelliferous Era, is defined as, "6 < n < 14". This is the current era, in which matter is arranged in the form of stars, galaxies, and galaxy clusters, and most energy is produced in stars. Stars will be the most dominant objects of the universe in this era. Massive stars use up their fuel very rapidly, in as little as a few million years. Eventually, the only luminous stars remaining will be white dwarf stars. By the end of this era, bright stars as we know them will be gone, their nuclear fuel exhausted, and only white dwarfs, brown dwarfs, neutron stars and black holes will remain. In this section, Olbers' paradox is discussed.

=== Degenerate Era ===
The Degenerate Era is defined as "15 < n < 39". This is the era of brown dwarfs, white dwarfs, neutron stars and black holes. White dwarfs will assimilate dark matter and continue with a nominal energy output. As this era continues, the authors hypothesize that protons will begin to decay (violating the conservation of baryon number given by the Standard Model). If proton decay takes place, the sole survivors will be black holes. If so, life becomes nearly impossible as planets decay.

=== Black Hole Era ===
The Black Hole Era is defined as "40 < n < 100". In this era, according to the book, organized matter will remain only in the form of black holes. Black holes themselves slowly "evaporate" away the matter contained in them, by the quantum mechanical process of Hawking radiation. By the end of this era, only extremely low-energy photons, electrons, positrons, and neutrinos will remain.

=== Dark Era ===
The Dark Era is defined as "n > 101". By this era, with only very diffuse matter remaining, activity in the universe will have tailed off dramatically, with very low energy levels and very large time scales. Electrons and positrons drifting through space will encounter one another and occasionally form positronium atoms. These structures are unstable, however, and their constituent particles must eventually annihilate. Other low-level annihilation events will also take place, albeit very slowly. Essentially, the universe will eventually turn into a void.

== Future revision ==
The book was published in 1999. As of November 2013, Gregory Laughlin makes the following statement on his web site:

A large number of interesting developments have occurred in physics and astronomy since the book was written, and many of these advances have a strong impact on our understanding of how the future will unfold. Fred and I are currently working on an update of the material in The Five Ages.
