= Kalshi =

American online prediction gambling company

Kalshi Inc.
- Type: Private
- Industry: Prediction market, Sports betting
- Founded: 2018; 8 years ago
- Founders: Tarek Mansour; Luana Lopes Lara
- Headquarters: 594 Broadway; New York, NY 10012; U.S.
- Revenue: c. US$260 million (2025; estimate)
- Website: kalshi.com

Kalshi Inc. is a prediction market platform based in Manhattan, New York City, that launched in July 2021. The platform is used primarily for sports betting, which constitutes more than 90% of site activity and 89% of revenue in 2025. Analysts describe activity on the platform as "heavily tied to the sports calendar". Individuals can place bets on other future outcomes, including economic indicators, weather patterns, awards, political and legislative outcomes, and military conflicts.

The site has been involved in several controversies and lawsuits regarding the legality of its sports and election markets, the ethics of allowing wagers on sensitive geopolitical issues, and insider trading involving politicians. Concerns over election integrity and declining public trust in the democratic process caused by election betting have been raised by consumer advocacy groups and politicians. As a result, the United States Senate banned its senators and their staff from betting on prediction markets such as Kalshi in May 2026.

Some, including political scientist John M. Sides, have challenged whether Kalshi efficiently and accurately aggregates information about outcomes. On the other hand, Liz Hoffman argued in Semafor that from 2021 to mid-2026 Kalshi demonstrated "a high degree of precision, particularly for economic and financial markets like inflation, unemployment, and commodities prices." A February 2026 study published by the Federal Reserve found that the "prediction market platform is a useful method for measuring macroeconomic expectations."

Kalshi does not publicly disclose its total number of users, but according to the site, there are 2.9 unprofitable users for each profitable one.

== History ==
In 2018, financial analysts Tarek Mansour and Luana Lopes Lara established Kalshi in San Francisco, California. Initially, the project was named "Kownig". In November 2020, Kalshi attained a license from the Commodities Futures Trading Commission (CFTC), registering the platform as a designated contract market and the first regulated platform to trade directly on the outcomes of events and event contracts. The site was publicly launched in July 2021. Beginning in 2022, Kalshi's attempts to offer political and election-related betting faced sustained legal and regulatory challenges from the CFTC. The agency delayed its decisions on these contracts, questioning whether they constituted valid risk-hedging tools and if they served the public interest. Internal disagreement emerged when Commissioner Caroline Pham dissented, arguing the contracts were not prohibited and did not require a public-interest test.

In 2023, another months-long legal dispute began between Kalshi and the CFTC. Kalshi maintained that its contracts serve the public interest, whereas the CFTC contended that they constitute illegal gambling and that the agency lacks the resources to oversee them effectively. Chairman Rostin Behnam cautioned that allowing election contracts could "ultimately commoditize and degrade the integrity" of the electoral process. Despite revised proposals that allowed very large bets by hedge funds and institutions, the CFTC ultimately rejected Kalshi's congressional control contracts in September 2023. Kalshi responded by suing the agency, claiming it exceeded its authority. After a 2024 ruling by the DC District Court stating that the CFTC had overstepped by blocking the contracts, and an appellate court later rejected the CFTC's request for a stay, Kalshi was allowed to relaunch its congressional control betting operations.

In 2025, Kalshi became the infrastructure for Robinhood's Prediction Markets Hub event contracts.

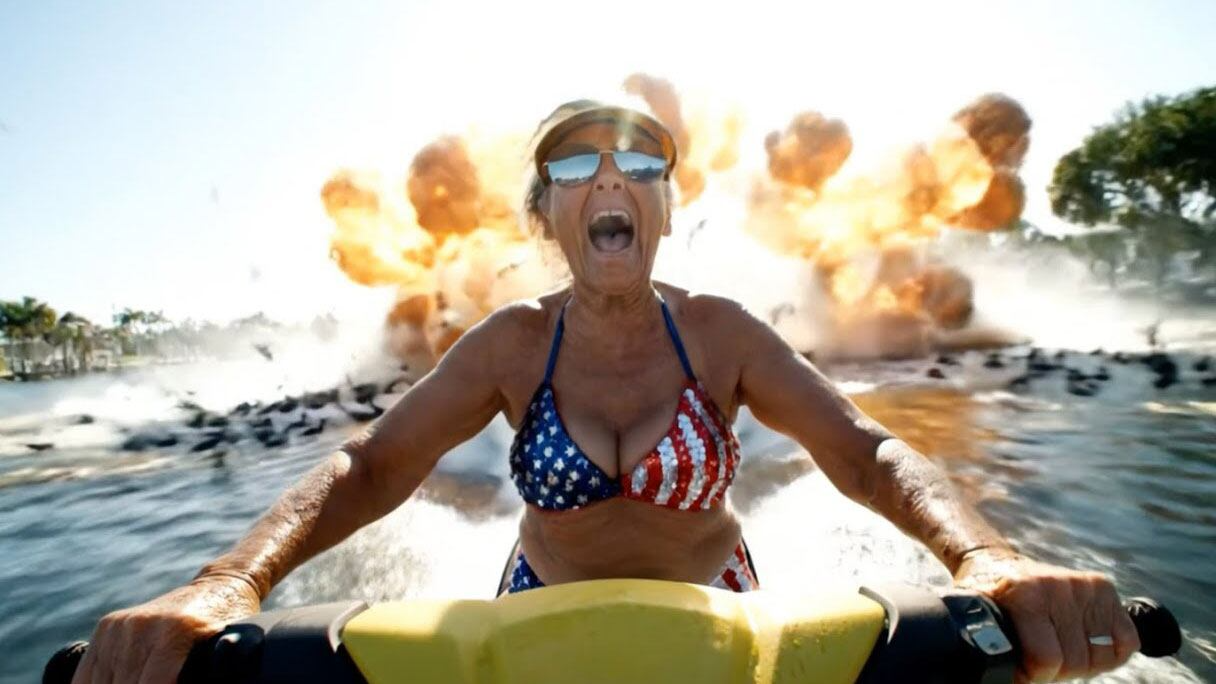
Screenshot of the "World Gone Mad" advertisement

During the NBA finals that year, Kalshi aired an ad that was created using generative AI models, such as Google's Veo 3 and OpenAI's ChatGPT. Reactions to the ad that was created by a self-proclaimed "AI filmmaker" were decidedly mixed, with Business Insider deeming it "chaotic". Later that same year 2025, Kalshi signed formal partnerships with media outlets CNN and CNBC. This potentially brought betting odds into NFL television broadcasts, a practice already common with data from traditional sportsbooks. A volume of $3 billion to $5 billion was bet on NFL games, with Barron's saying that "Kalshi [...] Need[s] the NFL." Mansour stated, "The long-term vision is to financialize everything and create a tradeable asset out of any difference in opinion." As of May 2026, the company is valued at $22 billion following a TCV-led funding round. According to Kalshi, the platform got 3 million new users during the 2026 FIFA World Cup, setting a record for a single market after traders poured over $1.2 billion into predicting the World Cup winner.

In 2026, Kalshi continued expanding beyond traditional prediction markets by moving further into financial derivatives. The company launched federally regulated perpetual futures products tied initially to cryptocurrency markets and began discussions with regulators about expanding these contracts to additional asset classes, including metals, foreign exchange, and energy markets. In October 2026, Kalishi introduced a perpetual futures contract lied to its US 500 index, which tracks 500 of the largest U.S. companies. The contract lets traders take leveraged positions on the index without having to worry about a set expiration date. The expansion placed Kalshi in closer competition with established derivatives exchanges such as CME Group, while also raising questions about leverage, retail investor protection, and regulatory boundaries between event contracts and traditional futures products. In the same year, Kalshi signed formal partnership with media outlet Fox News. In July 2026, Kalshi sent a cease-and-desist letter to Netflix, Inc. which had released a documentary trailer containing footage of World Cup bets placed in Nevada. The company requested the trailer be taken down and said in a statement that the documentary was a "sensationalized film built on fiction".

== Controversies ==
=== Efforts to make the site accessible for younger audiences ===
In 2025, Kalshi engaged in efforts to create a "student ambassadors" program where students could sign up to promote Kalshi on their campuses, in order to "[bring] the next 100M users to prediction markets." Following a backlash, the related social media post and webpage were taken down. Nonetheless, Kalshi continued to promote itself to college students. Critics noted that the treatment of prediction markets as commodity contracts, rather than betting sites, effectively lowered the age limit from 21 to 18.

=== Betting on the Gaza genocide ===
The site has been heavily criticized for including and thus capitalizing on humanitarian issues, such as whether the Palestinian population would be suffering from a food shortage due to the Gaza genocide.

=== Opposition to Kalshi's election betting ===
While Kalshi argues that betting on political event would improve oversight to political and economic developments while also providing accurate forecasting data (which has been challenged by scholars), critics such as Consumer advocacy groups like Better Markets contend that election betting could undermine election integrity and public trust by turning elections into speculative trading vehicles. In August 2023, in a letter to the Commodity Futures Trading Commission, Democratic senators Jeff Merkley, Sheldon Whitehouse, Ed Markey, Elizabeth Warren, Chris Van Hollen and Dianne Feinstein urged the CFTC to reject Kalshi's proposal, raising concerns over electoral integrity. The 2024 ruling that permitted Kalshi to relaunch its election outcome betting was described as "a sad and ominous day for election integrity" by Stephen Hall of Better Markets. In January 2025, Kalshi hired Donald Trump Jr. as a strategic adviser, with compensation that included more than $300,000 worth of Kalshi shares. In 2025, Trump Jr. also joined the advisory board of prediction-market company Polymarket and acquired a stake in the company through 1789 Capital, an investment firm with which he is associated.

=== Holding back payouts of won NFL bets ===
In January 2026, users who held correct positions on certain NFL bets were only repaid their original stake, rather than the full winnings. Only following backlash by many users and gambling industry analyst Dustin Gouker, Kalshi reacted and paid out the users.

=== Insider trading ===
In February 2026, a video editor for YouTuber MrBeast was fined and suspended from Kalshi for suspected insider trading.

In April 2026, Kalshi fined and suspended three congressional candidates for betting on their own political campaigns.

In July, it was alleged that teleprompter operator for President of the United States Donald Trump, Gabriel Perez, had misused the platform by betting almost $100,000 on words that the President said during Trump's 2026 State of the Union.

In August, regulators fined former congressional representative George Santos over $35,000 and imposed a three year trading ban after a federal investigation found Santos manipulated traders on Kalshi. Santos, at the time a paid spokesman for the platform, had publicized his upcoming attendance at that year's State of the Union address, bet against the proposition on Kalshi's rival Polymarket and then did not attend. The United States Commodities Futures Trading Commission fined Santos $35,000, twice the profit he made. At the end of the month Kalshi, which had already dropped him as a spokesman, penalized him $70,000 and banned him from the platform for life, the first time they had taken that step.

=== Khamenei death ===
After Iranian supreme leader Ali Khamenei was killed by Israeli airstrikes, Kalshi froze $54 million in trades on a contract predicting Khamenei would be "out as Supreme Leader" by future dates, stating the site "doesn't allow transactions 'directly tied to death'". According to The Washington Post, Kalshi "heavily promoted" the trade. Kalshi agreed the wording was "grammatically ambiguous" and later standardized its terms for markets affected by the death of a key figure to settle at the odds prior to that person's death, subsequently making approximately $2.2 million in reimbursements to users.

=== Spotify fraudulent streams ===
In July 2026, Spotify became involved in a controversy after confirming the removal of over 500,000 artificial streams from the song "Earrings" by artist Malcolm Todd, which had suddenly reached the top of the platform's daily charts in the United States. The fraud was initially detected and flagged by a trader on Kalshi, who was using Spotify data analysis to wager on the chart performance of songs. The trader questioned the legitimacy of the sudden spike in streams, prompting Spotify to investigate and confirm the manipulation of figures through bots.

== Regulation and bans ==
=== United States ===
==== Arizona ====
In March of 2026, Arizona Attorney General Kris Mayes and state prosecutors filed criminal charges against Kalshi, alleging that it was running an illegal gambling business and election wagering. The release noted that Arizonans were able to bet on professional and sporting events, individual player performance, and political issues, like whether the SAVE Act would become law. The 20 charges were all misdemeanors, punishable by fines up to $20,000. Kalshi said in a statement that the charges were "meritless" and they were looking forward to fighting the charges in court. In May 2026, these charges were dismissed, with federal judge Michael T. Liburdi ruling that federal law preempts state law because Kalshi falls under the exclusive jurisdiction of the CFTC.

==== Massachusetts ====
In September 2025, Massachusetts Attorney General Andrea Campbell filed a lawsuit that accused Kalshi of "promoting and accepting sports wagers" without following Massachusetts gambling laws, as the practice is banned there.

In January 2026, a Massachusetts Superior Court judge issued a preliminary injunction against Kalshi, effectively banning the platform from offering sports-based betting within the state. Under the court order, Kalshi was required to implement geofencing technology to block Massachusetts residents from accessing sports-related markets on its platform.

==== Michigan ====
In March 2026, Michigan Attorney General Dana Nessel, in collaboration with the Michigan Gaming Control Board, filed a lawsuit against Kalshi. They allege that the platform conducts illegal sports betting, as Kalshi's operations in Michigan circumvent the state's Lawful Sports Betting Act, requiring such platforms to be licensed through the Michigan Gaming Control Board.

In a press statement, Nessel said that "Corporations cannot circumvent state gaming laws" and that her office is working towards "[...] ensur[ing] that betting in [Michigan] remains lawful, fair and subject to the oversight of [its] residents expect and deserve.”

==== Minnesota ====
In May 2026, Minnesota enacted a law banning prediction markets as of August 1, 2026. The U.S. DOJ filed a lawsuit the following day seeking to stop the law from taking effect. In July 2026, a federal judge ruled against Minnesota, finding that "the CFTC has exclusive jurisdiction" over platforms like Kalshi.

==== Nevada ====
In March 2026, a temporary ban on Kalshi was enacted in Nevada. On March 20, 2026, the first Judicial District Court of Nevada issued a 14-day restraining order, barring the company from "offering a derivatives exchange and prediction market which offers event-based contracts relating to sports, election, and entertainment related events" without having first obtained gambling licenses. The ban was extended in April, ahead of a pending long-term injunction. In June, the Nevada Gaming Control Board requested a contempt citation and "significant" fines for a failure to comply with a court order issued the month before, requiring it to geo block access in the state. On July 24, 2026, the Nevada Gaming Control Board announced that it had reached an agreement with Kalshi (KalshiEX LLC) to halt its "continued unlawful operation in Nevada".

==== New York ====
In November 2025, a proposed class action lawsuit was filed against Kalshi in New York state, alleging that Kalshi "engaged in illegal deceptive activity, and unjustly enriched itself at the expense of tens of thousands of consumers" by operating unlicensed sports betting as well as leading users to unknowingly bet against Kalshi or its partners rather than against other users. Kalshi co-founder Luana Lopes Lara called the lawsuit "baseless".

In July 2026, New York Attorney General Letitia James filed a lawsuit in New York State Supreme Court, alleging Kalshi as illegal, unlicensed gambling, and demanding that it submit to state regulators and taxes, forfeit profits, and compensate user nationwide, a penalty of approximately $36 billion. The suit also seeks to penalize the company. The Commodity Futures Trading Commission, stating that prediction markets are its exclusive purview, subsequently filed for a temporary restraining order, in order to halt the New York State lawsuit.

==== Ohio ====
On March 9, 2026, Ohio federal judge Sarah D. Morrison ruled that Kalshi's products amounted to gambling in the state of Ohio and should come under the jurisdiction of the Ohio Casino Control Commission rather than the CFTC. Morrison's opinion expressed she wanted to "avoid absurdity". Ohio Attorney General Dave Yost celebrated the ruling, commenting on X that the ruling was a "big win" for the state. Kalshi, in its response, pledged to appeal, citing a positive injunctive ruling coming from Tennessee.

==== Washington ====
On March 27, 2026, the state of Washington filed a lawsuit against Kalshi, alleging that the company has been operating in violation of state laws concerning illegal gambling. On the same day Kalshi filed a notice of removal to federal court, arguing that the charges concern federally regulated derivatives.

In July 2026, King County Superior Court Judge John McHale granted Washington's request for a preliminary injunction blocking Kalshi from offering event contracts in the state. McHale found that the state had demonstrated a likelihood of substantial harm to consumers if an injunction was not issued. Kalshi maintained that states lacked jurisdiction to regulate prediction markets.

==== Wisconsin ====
In April 2026, Wisconsin Attorney General Josh Kaul filed lawsuits against Kalshi, Coinbase, Polymarket and others, alleging they are bypassing state laws in order to run illegal gambling schemes in Wisconsin by characterizing sports bets as "event contracts." In a virtual news conference on April 23, he said that "Sports betting and other forms of commercial gambling have long been illegal in the state of Wisconsin," and that "No company is above this law no matter how creatively those companies try to disguise the activity they're engaged in."

==== Native reservations ====
In July 2025, three Californian tribes—the Blue Lake Rancheria, Chicken Ranch Rancheria of Me-Wuk Indians and Picayune Rancheria of Chukchansi Indians—filed a federal lawsuit against Kalshi, alleging that it is conducting illegal sports gambling on tribal lands in violation of federal gaming laws. They argue that Kalshi’s sports event contracts constitute Class III gaming under the Indian Gaming Regulatory Act and thus violate their exclusive right to regulate gaming on reservation lands.

In September of the same year, the Ho-Chunk Nation of Wisconsin filed a similar lawsuit.

=== Federal government response ===
Following civil lawsuits against Kalshi and others that were issued by the states of Wisconsin and New York, the Commodity Futures Trading Commission sought to reaffirm its exclusive jurisdiction over prediction markets and filed lawsuits against the two states in response. Chairman Michael S. Selig said that "States cannot circumvent the clear directive of Congress," and that "[the Commissions's] message to Wisconsin is the same as to New York, Arizona, and others: if you interfere with the operation of federal law in regulating financial markets, we will sue you." Similar lawsuits were issued against Arizona, Connecticut, Illinois, and Massachusetts and subsequently against Minnesota. Donald Trump wrote in a social media post that it was “critically important” that the CFTC retain “exclusive authority” over prediction markets, calling former New Jersey Governor Chris Christie, New York attorney general Letitia James, Minnesota Governor Tim Walz, and Illinois Governor JB Pritzker "SCUM" for trying to set rules at the state level.

== Restricted countries ==
In these National Jurisdictions, Kalshi is restricted.

As of June 2026, 55 international jurisdictions have taken steps to restrict accessibility to Kalshi. Those are:

- Afghanistan
- Algeria
- Angola
- Australia
- Belarus
- Belgium
- Bolivia
- Brazil
- Bulgaria
- Burkina Faso
- Cameroon
- Canada
- Central African Republic
- Côte d'Ivoire
- Cuba
- Democratic Republic of the Congo
- Ethiopia
- France
- Greece
- Haiti
- Hungary
- India
- Indonesia
- Iran
- Iraq
- Italy
- Kenya
- Laos
- Lebanon
- Libya
- Mali
- Monaco
- Mozambique
- Myanmar (Burma)
- Namibia
- New Zealand
- Nicaragua
- Niger
- North Korea
- People's Republic of China
- Poland
- Romania
- Russia
- Singapore
- Somalia
- South Sudan
- Spain
- Sudan
- Switzerland
- Syria
- Taiwan
- Thailand
- Ukraine
- United Arab Emirates
- United Kingdom
- Venezuela
- Yemen
- Zimbabwe

== See also ==
- PredictIt
- Polymarket
- Manifold (prediction market)
- Intrade
- iPredict
