= Brazilian Astronomy Olympiad =

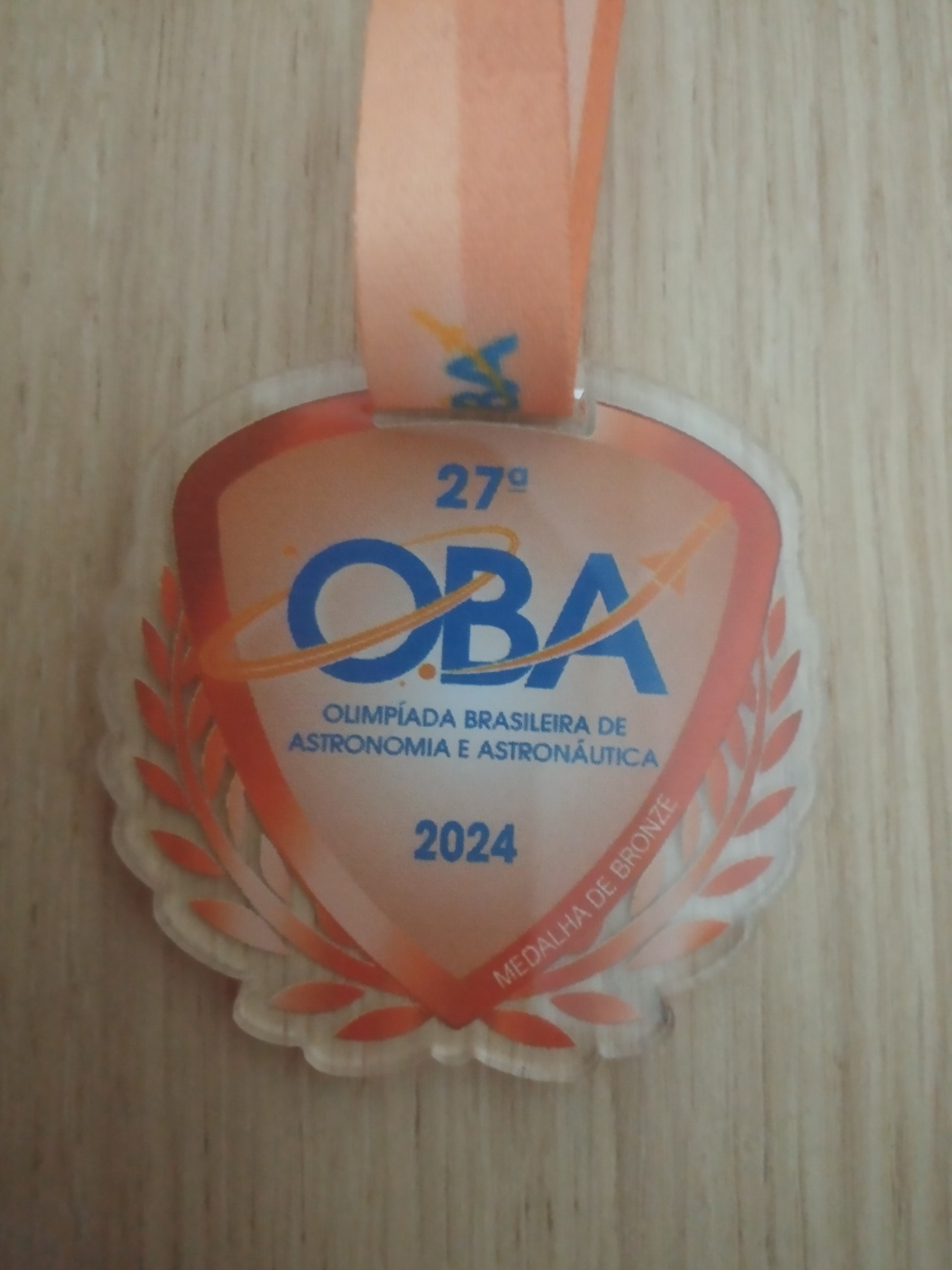
Bronze medal of OBA in 2024

The Brazilian Astronomy and Astronautics Olympiad (in Portuguese: Olimpíada Brasileira de Astronomia e Astronáutica - OBA) is a national astronomy competition realized since 1998 in Brazilian schools by the Brazilian Astronomical Society (SAB). Since 2005, the Brazilian Space Agency (AEB) started to participate in the olympiad's organizing committee, with the event officially acquiring its current name.

== Goals ==
Comparable to other science competitions in the country, the OBA has its main goal of spreading the knowledge of astronomy throughout all of Brazilian society, encouraging youths' interest in astronomy and astronautics and in scientific thought in general.
