= Tarek Mansour =

Lebanese-American businessman

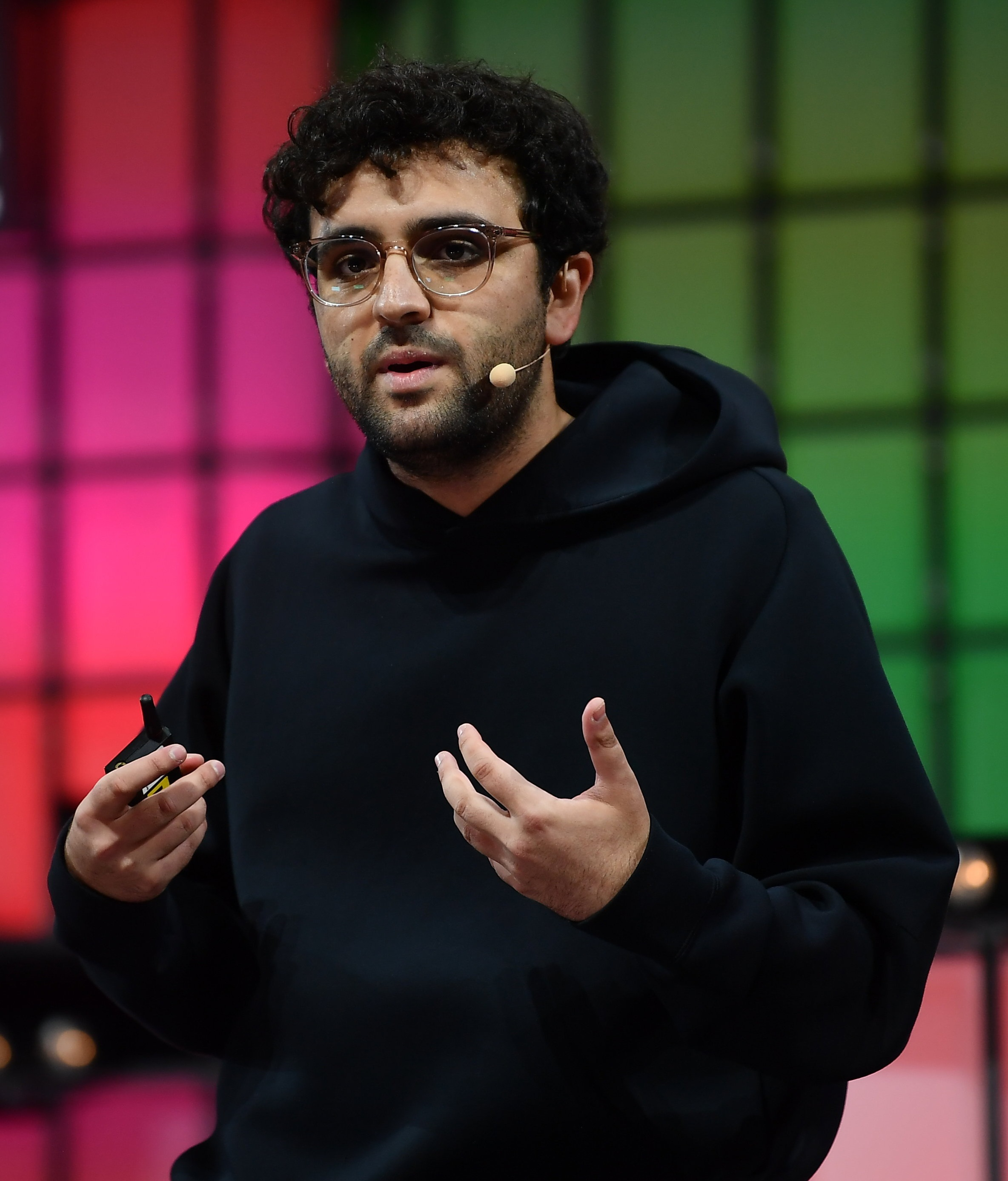
- Mansour in 2021
- Born: May 7, 1996 (age 30); California, U.S.
- Education: Massachusetts Institute of Technology (BS)
- Known for: Co-founder and CEO of Kalshi

Tarek Mansour (born 1996) (Note: Arabic: طارق منصور) is a Lebanese-American entrepreneur, billionaire, and co-founder and CEO of the online prediction market Kalshi. His net worth is estimated at $2.6 billion in June 2026.

== Early life and education ==
Mansour was born in California to Lebanese parents before moving to Lebanon, where he attended Collège Louise Wegmann. He returned to the United States in 2014 to attend MIT. Mansour graduated from MIT with degrees in mathematics and computer science in 2018.

== Career ==
While a student at MIT, Mansour interned at Goldman Sachs in 2016, and later worked as a trader at Citadel until 2018.He later cited those experiences as inspiration for starting Kalshi.

=== Kalshi ===
Mansour founded Kalshi in 2018 with Luana Lopes Lara. The two met as students at MIT. The company launched in July 2021. Following the company's $11 billion valuation, Forbes reported in December 2025 that both Mansour and Lopes were billionaires.

== Personal life ==
Mansour is Catholic. He has a Catholic father and an Orthodox mother.
