= The Civilian =

Satirical news website in New Zealand

- Founder: Ben Uffindell
- Founded: 2013
- Website: thecivilian.co.nz

The Civilian is a satirical New Zealand website. It was started in 2013 by Ben Uffindell, who finished a degree in political science at University of Canterbury in 2012. It has been compared to the US satirical website/newspaper The Onion. In April 2013 The Civilian received about 15,000 page views per day, and in a May 2013 interview Uffindell stated an average of 20,000–25,000 page views per day.

The site caused controversy when Conservative Party leader Colin Craig threatened to sue for defamation over satirical quotes regarding his stance on same-sex marriage.

In June 2014, Uffindell announced through his website his intention of forming a political party. The Civilian Party was registered by the Electoral Commission on 11 August 2014.

== See also ==
- List of satirical magazines
- List of satirical news websites
- List of satirical television news programs
