= PredictIt =

United States-based prediction market

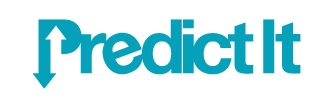
- PredictIt logo
- Website type: Prediction market
- Website: www.predictit.org
- Commercial: No
- Registration: Required for trading
- Launched: 3 November 2014; 11 years ago
- Current status: Has CTFC approval to operate under the terms of a No Action letter granted by the Commodity Futures Trading Commission (CFTC) in October, 2014.

PredictIt is a United States-based online prediction market that offers exchanges on political and financial events. PredictIt is a project of the Prediction Market Research Consortium, a not-for-profit organization, for educational purposes and is supported by Aristotle, Inc. The company's office is located in Washington, D.C. Only United States citizens can bet on the site.

== Trading format ==
PredictIt uses a continuous double auction to sell shares for each event in its markets, meaning that for every person who predicts that an event will take place, there must be another person who predicts that it will not. The site groups related predictions into a market. Operating expenses are covered by charging a fee of 10% on earnings in excess of the original investment and by charging an additional 5% withdrawal fee. PredictIt has many different categories of markets, including questions about presidential administration, U.S. elections, Congress, state/local elections, and world politics. Questions vary from asking which political party will win certain elections, which candidate will win, what the margin of victory for the winner will be, and even what the results of future polls on RealClearPolitics and FiveThirtyEight will be.

== History ==
=== Launch and CFTC no-action letter ===
PredictIt was launched on 3 November 2014 as a nonprofit educational project of the Victoria University of Wellington, New Zealand. The platform was created by John Aristotle Phillips in collaboration with the University. To obtain an approval of the Commodity Futures Trading Commission (CFTC), PredictIt "had to work around federal laws that prohibit online gambling and govern commodity futures trading." The University secured a no-action letter from the Commodity Futures Trading Commission (CFTC), eliminating the risk of prosecution for illegal online gambling. In order to secure the no-action letter, each question was limited to 5,000 traders, and there was an $850 cap on individual investments per question. These restrictions were modeled after the Iowa Electronic Markets, which previously secured a no-action letter from the Commodity Futures Trading Commission.

The work permit was issued on the condition that the professors would operate it for free and that the data would be used for academic research rather than for recreational wagering purposes. The main operational work of the site was handed over to the political software company Aristotle Inc., founded by John Aristotle Phillips.

By March 2016, the website had approximately 29,000 active traders. During the 2016 United States elections, PredictIt, along with other prediction market websites, received attention from various media outlets.

As of 2019, trading volume was estimated at about 250 million shares per year.

Phillips emphasizes the platform's educational effect ‘because it inspires people to pay closer attention to politics’. He also states that markets prove to be much more accurate than polls, and that they give a great public benefit, practically helping ‘people to understand the future’.

=== 2022 CFTC Action letter and lawsuit ===
On 4 August 2022, the CFTC announced that Victoria University has not operated PredictIt in compliance with the terms of the no-action letter and as a result the no-action letter had been withdrawn. The CFTC stated that all related and remaining listed contracts and positions on PredictIt should be closed out and/or liquidated no later than 11:59 p.m. (EDT) on 15 February 2023. In September 2022, PredictIt and Aristotle International filed suit against the CFTC in the U.S. District Court for the Western District of Texas to block the action.

On 26 January 2023, the Fifth Circuit granted a temporary injunction allowing PredictIt to continue operating while the court considered further term relief for the organization.

In July 2025, PredictIt won the case. Under the new agreement with the CFTC, a $850 single contract cap was raised to $3500, and a former 5,000-person cap for each market was cancelled.

On September 5, 2025, PredictIt won approval to expand operations as a regulated derivatives exchange. This helped PredictIt to level the playing field with competitors such as Kalshi, Polymarket, and Crypto.com. The exchange and clearinghouse was scheduled to launch in October 2025.

== Controversy ==
PredictIt uses its roots as a nonprofit educational project as a front for large-scale political gambling. It offers a data sharing program for members of the academic community and claims to have over 160 data partners, including researchers affiliated with Duke University, Harvard University, the Massachusetts Institute of Technology, the Oklahoma State University, the University of Michigan, the University of Pennsylvania, the University of Virginia, and Yale University. However, in response to a request made in 2019 by Bloomberg News, among several dozen researchers mentioned by PredictIt as collaborating with it, not a single one confirmed that they had relied on the company's data in their work. Several researchers were not even aware that PredictIt had mentioned them on its list. The Aristotle spokesman was able to provide a list of only 15 scientific articles and presentations that have used PredictIt data over the past few years.

There are concerns that PredictIt and similar prediction markets exacerbate the gamification of an American political system, and that gambling on elections may contribute to the corruption of democracy.

Jon Kimball and David Rees wrote in The Washington Post that PredictIt can be addictive, similar to gambling.

== See also ==
- Kalshi
- Metaculus
- Polymarket
- Intrade
- iPredict
