= Fred Adams =

American astrophysicist

- Born: 1961 (age 64–65)
- Education: UC–Berkeley (Ph.D.); Iowa State University (B.S.)
- Awards: Robert J. Trumpler Award (1991); Helen B. Warner Prize for Astronomy (1996); Fellow of the American Physical Society (2013)
- Scientific career
- Fields: Astrophysics
- Workplaces: Michigan (1991–); Harvard–Smithsonian Center for Astrophysics (1988–1991)
- Doctoral advisor: Frank Shu

Fred C. Adams (born 1961) is an American astrophysicist who has made contributions to the study of physical cosmology.

Fred Adams is the Ta-You Wu Collegiate Professor of Physics at the University of Michigan, where his main field of research is astrophysics theory focusing on star formation, planet formation, and dynamics. His seminal work on the radiative signature of star formation has provided a foundation for further studies in star formation. In more recent years, he has studied the formation and evolution of planetary systems, including the effect of the stellar birth cluster environment.

== Biography ==
Adams attended Iowa State University, earning a B.S. in 1983. He then earned his Ph.D. from the University of California, Berkeley in 1988. He continued his research at the Center for Astrophysics | Harvard & Smithsonian from 1988 to 1991, before joining the faculty at the University of Michigan in 1991. Since 1991, Adams has been a professor of physics at the University of Michigan, earning the Excellence in Education Award from the University of Michigan College of Literature, Science, and the Arts in 1995 and 1999 and the Faculty Recognition Award in 2002.

Adams works in the general area of theoretical astrophysics with a focus on the study of star formation and cosmology. He is internationally recognized for his work on the radiation signature of the star formation process, the dynamics of circumstellar disks, and the physics of molecular clouds. He has received recognition as an astrophysicist including the Robert J. Trumpler Award and the Helen B. Warner Prize. His recent work in star formation includes the development of a theory for the initial mass function for forming stars and studies of extra-solar planetary systems. In cosmology, he has studied many aspects of the inflationary universe, cosmological phase transitions, magnetic monopoles, cosmic rays, anti-matter, the cosmic background radiation, galactic halos of dark matter, and the long-term future of the universe. He has also studied the dynamics of the Solar System and of extrasolar planets, and has discovered 24 exoplanets and 8 Kuiper Belt Objects.

He is the co-author of the 1999 book The Five Ages of the Universe with Greg Laughlin.

== Selected publications ==
Adams has published more than 200 papers and conference proceedings. His work has been cited thousands of times by other researchers, and a list of his most famous results and books is included below:

- Proton Decay, Black Holes, and Large Extra Dimensions, (F. C. Adams, G. L. Kane, M. Mbonye, and M. J. Perry), International Journal of Modern Physics A 16, 2399–2410 hep-ph/0009154 (2001).
- Modes of Multiple Star Formation, (F. C. Adams and P. C. Myers), The Astrophysical Journal 553 744-753 astro-ph/0102039 (2001). A Theoretical Model for the Mbh— ó Relation for Supermassive Black Holes in Galaxies, (F. C. Adams, D. S. Graff, and D. O. Richstone), The Astrophysical Journal Letters 551, L31-35 astro-ph/0010549 (2001).
- Stability and Chaos in the Upsilon Andromedae Planetary System, (G. Laughlin and F. C. Adams), The Astrophysical Journal 526, 881-889 (1999).
- A Dying Universe: The Long Term Fate and Evolution of Astrophysical Objects, (F. C. Adams and G. Laughlin), Reviews of Modern Physics 69, 337-372 (1997).
- A Theory of the Initial Mass Function for Star Farmation in Molecular Clouds, (F. C. Adams and M. Fatuzzo), The Astrophysical Journal 464, 256-271 (1996).
- Vortices in Circumstellar Disks, (F. C. Adams and R. Watkins), The Astrophysical Journal 451, 314-327 (1995).
- Spectral Evolution of Young Stellar Objects, (F. C. Adams, C. J. Lada, and F. H. Shu), The Astrophysical Journal 312, 788-806 (1987).
- The Five Ages of the Universe: Inside the Physics of Eternity, (F. Adams and G. Laughlin), New York: The Free Press 256 pages, ISBN 0-684-85422-8 (1999).
- Origins of Existence: How Life Emerged in the Universe, (F. Adams), New York: The Free Press 256 pages, ISBN 0-7432-1262-2 (2002).
- Fred Adams, (1997). The Five Ages of the Universe: Inside the Physics of Eternity, Free Press. ISBN 0-684-86576-9
