= Stock market simulator =

Computer software for practicing stock trading

A stock market simulator is computer software that reproduces behavior and features of a stock market, so that a user may practice trading stocks without financial risk. Paper trading, sometimes also called "virtual stock trading", is a simulated trading process in which would-be investors can practice investing without committing money.

This is accomplished by the manipulation of simulated money and investment positions that behave in a manner similar to the real markets. Investors also use paper trading to test new and different investment strategies. Stock market games are often used for educational purposes.

For example, investors can create several different positions simultaneously to compare the performance and payoff characteristics between multiple strategies. A textbook may state that writing a covered call is synthetically the same as writing a naked put, but in practice there are subtle differences. With a paper trading account, an investor can set up a bull credit spread and a bull debit spread simultaneously and watch how the payoff for each position changes as the market moves.

Other advanced strategies include leverage, short-selling, forex and derivatives trading. Successful execution and profit generation from these strategies usually require high levels of technical knowledge. Investors can test these strategies with paper trading to avoid taking on excessive risk due to inexperience.

Various companies and online trading simulation tools offer paper trading services, some free, others with charges, that allow investors to try out various strategies (some stock brokerage firms allow 14-day "demo accounts"), or paper trading can be carried out simply by noting down fees and recording the value of investments over time.

The imaginary money of paper trading is sometimes also called "paper money", "virtual money", and "Monopoly money".

Stock market simulators are used as educational tools that allow users to observe market dynamics and practice trading strategies without financial risk. They are often employed to illustrate concepts used in technical analysis, including indicators such as the Relative strength index (RSI), as well as measures such as benchmark comparisons, risk-adjusted returns, and moving averages.

== Types ==
Stock market simulators can be grouped into several common types, depending on their purpose and how they simulate trading.

=== Educational simulators ===
Used mainly in schools, universities, and training programs to teach the basics of investing and financial markets.

Educational institutions integrate stock market simulators into their curricula as practical learning tools for finance and economics education. The Stock Market Game, developed by the SIFMA Foundation, serves more than 600,000 students annually across the United States and has been implemented in educational settings since 1977. Universities commonly employ simulators in undergraduate and graduate business programs.

Business schools use simulators to complement theoretical instruction in investment analysis, portfolio management, and financial markets courses. The Wharton School of the University of Pennsylvania and the Stanford Graduate School of Business integrate simulation exercises into their MBA curricula, allowing students to apply classroom concepts in risk-free environments.

=== Financial simulators ===
Financial market simulators allow users to generate a portfolio based on real stock entries and help them train with virtual currency. Most of the currently active financial simulators use a delayed data feed of between 15 and 20 minutes to ensure that users cannot use their data to trade actively on a competing system. Some simulators can produce random data to mimic price activity. The purpose behind such a system is to let a person practice with fantasy funds in a real-world context so they can determine whether or not they would gain money investing by themselves.

=== Fantasy simulators ===
Fantasy simulators trade shares or derivatives of real world items or objects that normally would not be listed on a commodities list or market exchange, such as movies, books or television shows. Some simulators focus on sports and have been linked to active betting and wager based systems.

== Limitations ==
Simulators may not replicate the emotional and psychological aspects of real trading and can simplify trading mechanics. This may contribute to overconfidence when users transition to live financial markets. Some simulators also rely on delayed market data, which may not reflect real-time data and can affect users' understanding of trading decisions.

== Technology and implementation ==
Most of the online stock simulators run on either C, C#, Java, JavaScript, ASP or PHP with a MySQL or PostgreSQL database. Some of them are open source, and others are proprietary with the code being sold as valuable prediction market software. Such is the example with the HSX Virtual Specialist. This technology has been sold to major film studios such as MGM and Lion's Gate Films, as well as to the Popular Science team for use in their PPX system.

Stock Market simulator engines can also be customized for other functions than just basic stock information tracking. The HSX engine has been modified to track popular science trends and also to track YouTube videos. Other applications that can be implemented with this software include popularity tracking and ranking from a set scale rather than an actual numerical value.

== Stock market games ==
Stock market games are speculative games that allows players to trade stocks, futures, or currency in a virtual or simulated market environment.

Stock market games exist in several forms but the basic underlying concept is that these games allow players to gain experience or just entertainment by trading stocks in a virtual world where there is no real risk. Some stock market games do not involve real money in any way. Players compete with each other to see who can predict the direction the stock markets will go next. Many stock market games are based on real life stocks from the Nasdaq, NYSE, AMEX or other major market indexes.

Stock market games are often used for educational purposes to teach potential stock traders and future stock brokers how to trade stocks. Stock market games can also be used for entertainment purposes and to engage in fantasy trading competitions. They remain open longer than real markets and offer a more targeted experience, making them a preferred learning mechanism for some new traders.

Some stock market games are not based on financial markets at all. These virtual stock markets are often based on things like sports or entertainment "stocks". Players are asked to invest in a particular sports team for example. If the team is doing well, the stock goes up and if the team is playing badly the stock value for that team falls. Stock market games are often built into many other prediction games.

== Ethical and regulatory considerations ==
Stock market simulators have been discussed in the context of ethical and regulatory considerations related to market manipulation, volatility, and speculation. Some studies note that fantasy-style trading platforms may encourage behavior comparable to problem gambling by presenting trading in a game-like format. Certain platforms, including Robinhood, have received attention in discussions about gamification features in financial applications and their potential influence on inexperienced investors.

Regulatory oversight of stock market simulators remains limited but has been discussed in relation to investor education. For example, the U.S. Securities and Exchange Commission has issued materials concerning investor education tools, including simulated trading environments. Such materials note that platforms should disclose the limitations of simulated trading environments so that users do not assume that paper trading performance necessarily reflects real-world investment outcomes.

== See also ==
- Investment Game
