= Prediction game =

Allows users to guess the outcome of future events

A prediction game is a game which allow users to guess at the outcome of future events. Prediction games are generally operated online and are free for users to play. Points are awarded to players who most accurately predict the outcome of an event, and those points are converted into cash prizes.

== Introduction ==
Prediction games are a type of trivia game with a focus on the outcome of guessing future events rather than testing a player's knowledge of the past. They are not considered gambling and are not governed by gambling regulations. Prediction Games have recently become popular on the internet. These speculative games offer topics ranging from the world of entertainment, sports, and finance to various world current events. On the surface, Prediction Games may appear similar to prediction market games; however, there are major differences between the two. Prediction Games are free to play, simple to learn, and pay out real cash to winners. In contrast, Predictive Market Games often require real cash deposits, are more complicated to play (may rely on some knowledge of the stock market or other type of open market exchange), or don't pay out real cash at all.

Players, known as propheteers, can register (without the need to download any programs), start guessing, and earn cash points all in a matter of seconds. Propheteers will then begin competing with each other to see who can correctly predict events such as the outcome of a Major League Baseball game, who will be the next celebrity to enter rehab, or where the Dow Jones will close at on a particular day. Propheteers who correctly guess the outcome of an event are awarded points, which can be converted into cash payouts.

Some websites choose specific subjects for their players to predict the future on. For example, certain websites will offer only questions on political events, while others may be based entirely on celebrities. It has been found that predictive gaming websites catering primarily to sports fans have a strong following from the same types of players who enjoy fantasy sports. Knowledge of team statistics and player's rankings has proven to be a great competitive advantage. Similarly, fans of video sharing sites now have a video stock exchange where they can predict the popularity of videos. Players receive payouts weekly based upon the number of times a video has been viewed on the popular hosting sites.

Predictive games cover a wide variety of topics with thousands of questions to choose from.

== Legal considerations ==
Because Prediction Games are free to play, they are not considered gambling, and are thus legal in all fifty of the United States. Prediction Games are skill-based and do not require any purchases or cash wagers to be made in order for a propheteer to play.

Some gaming industry analysts are wary that this game may become highly addictive. Like Fantasy sports, on-the-job workers have on occasion spent so much time playing Prediction Games that office productivity could suffer a significant loss.

In India, prediction games are often considered illegal.

== Real world applications ==
Direct correlations have been found in results from groups surveyed on their predictions on many topics and the actual outcome of those events. For example, in the 1940s, large groups of individuals betting on elections had remarkable predictive accuracy.

Many corporations are realizing the value of finding consensus from prediction games and using that to determine influence and conditional influence on real events.

Furthermore, questions that focus on users' opinions of a certain outcome are often seen as polls. The results derived from these polls are a good indication of how the actual outcome of the event will unfold.

== See also ==
- Prediction Markets
- Trendio.com
