= Futarchy =

Proposed form of government

Futarchy is a form of government proposed by economist Robin Hanson, in which elected officials define measures of national wellbeing, and prediction markets are used to determine which policies will have the most positive effect. It was named by The New York Times as a buzzword of 2008. The idea has been subsequently expanded to explore its potential in the context of blockchains and the decentralized autonomous organization (DAO). The term "futarchy" combines the word "future" with the suffix "-archy," reflecting its claim to use market predictions to create a "rule by the (predicted) future".

== History ==
The concept of futarchy builds on earlier ideas in prediction markets and decision-making. Robin Hanson first explored related concepts in his 1999 paper "Decision Markets," which proposed using speculative markets to estimate the consequences of policy decisions, such as the impact of concealed carry laws on murder rates. In 2000, Hanson formalized futarchy in "Futarchy: Vote Values, But Bet Beliefs," introducing the slogan "vote on values, bet on beliefs" and outlining a system where democracy defines welfare metrics, but markets select policies to maximize them. Hanson refined the idea in his 2013 paper "Shall We Vote on Values, But Bet on Beliefs?," addressing criticisms and proposing mechanisms like conditional markets and welfare measurements. The concept gained attention in blockchain contexts with Vitalik Buterin's 2014 blog post "An Introduction to Futarchy," which explored its application to decentralized governance in Ethereum-based DAOs. Buterin also discussed related ideas in his 2018 post on DAICOs, blending ICOs with DAO governance elements.

== Mechanisms ==
In futarchy, values are determined democratically (e.g., via elections defining a welfare metric like augmented GDP), while beliefs about policy outcomes are aggregated through prediction markets. Conditional assets pay based on outcomes tied to whether a policy is adopted, allowing markets to estimate expected welfare. Proposals pass if markets predict higher welfare. Refinements include statistical models for price significance, agenda auctions, and veto mechanisms to handle future welfare definitions.

== Criticism ==
Economist Tyler Cowen has argued that "values and beliefs" cannot be easily separated: "I would bet against the future of futarchy, or its likelihood of succeeding were it in place." Other critiques include risks of market manipulation, thin liquidity, and challenges in defining comprehensive welfare metrics.

== See also ==
- Prediction market
- Decentralized autonomous organization
- World Happiness Report
