= No-action letter =

A no-action letter is a letter written by the staff members of a government agency, requested by an entity subject to regulation by that agency, indicating that the staff will not recommend that the agency take legal action against the entity, should the entity engage in a course of action proposed by the entity through its request for a no-action letter.

Often, a request is made because the legality of the course of action in question is uncertain, and in some cases a request may be granted when it is understood that the action is not technically legal, but is nonetheless acceptable according to a common sense approach to the situation.

== Examples ==
- United States Securities and Exchange Commission
- Consumer Financial Protection Bureau
- Australian Securities & Investments Commission
- Financial Services Agency (Japan)
