= IPredict =

New Zealand prediction market

iPredict
- Available in: English
- Headquarters: Wellington, {{{location_country}}}
- Parent: Victoria University of Wellington
- Website: www.ipredict.co.nz
- Launched: 9 September 2008
- Current status: Closed 1 December 2016

iPredict was a New Zealand prediction market that offered prediction exchanges on current events, political issues and economic issues. iPredict was jointly owned by the New Zealand Institute for the Study of Competition and Regulation and Victoria University of Wellington. The site launched on 9 September 2008 and closed 1 December 2016.

iPredict's system was a prediction market that allowed members to trade contracts (take 'positions') on whether future events would or would not occur. The contracts had judgement criteria that defined how they would be settled. For example, a contract could be called "There will be a National Party Prime Minister after the next General Election". Other events included financial predictions, such as "The NZX50 Gross Index closes equal or higher on Friday 7 December, than the closing price on Thursday 6 December." iPredict facilitated trades between members, but did not participate in trading itself.

Traders could either buy (go long on) contracts, indicating that the event would happen or sell (go short on) contracts, indicating the event would not happen. The trading unit was a contract with a settlement value, typically either $0 or $1 and the contract could trade between these values where 1 percent equals $0.01 in value. If the event specified in a given contract occurred, the contract settled at 100 percent or $1; otherwise, the contract settled at 0 or $0 in value. Thus, the current price of the contract could be imputed as the market's global opinion of the probability that the specified event would occur. Traders could trade both before and during an event. iPredict often had a market maker to provide a two way price at almost all times.

== Contracts ==
iPredict provided a wide variety of contracts including many New Zealand political stocks, elections in other countries including the United States, Australia, Britain, Japan, Germany, Brazil, Italy and Spain. They also provided markets in financial market outcomes, economic indicators in New Zealand, and other leading international economies. There were also stocks related to International Relations, and Science and Technology. Anyone was free to make a suggestion for a stock in the website's forum.

== Fees ==
iPredict charged a Trading Fee of $0.0050 per share traded (50 cents per 100 shares traded). The Trading Fee was capped at 5% of any trade's gross cash value, and capped at $5 per month per user. There was a 1.75% fee on credit card deposits. Users could also make a manual bank deposit which incurs no fee. There was a withdrawal fee of 4% or $2 (whichever is greater) which is levied on withdrawals, but only if a trader has positive earnings on iPredict.

In 2011 iPredict proposed a $2.50 monthly account fee as well as a $2.50 sign up fee, however these plans were abandoned after a negative response from traders. Each trading persona was expected (under the stated rules) to control only one account on iPredict, with limited funds of up to $2,500 per six monthly period able to be deposited in each account.

== Legal status and technical problems ==
Under the New Zealand Gambling Act 1993, only the New Zealand Lotteries Commission and the TAB are permitted to accept bets by internet or phone. However, iPredict was authorised by the New Zealand Securities Commission as an authorised futures dealer, so was therefore lawful. This was met with opposition from the Problem Gambling Foundation.

In 2012 the website was hit by a run of technical problems, causing it to operate at greatly reduced speeds and go offline for a number of days at a time on at least two occasions. This caused problems for iPredict commercially for its deal with Exceltium.

In 2013 a single $60 bet placed by a trader speculating on a previously lowly traded contract relating to Peter Dunne who was under investigation relating to the Kitteridge report caused a high volume of erratic trades and media coverage. The volume of activity caused iPredict to go offline which was initially considered to be a denial of service attack. The incident is considered to have harmed the credibility of iPredict as a trustworthy political predictor at the time, after some media coverage which took it to be credible information initially.

By 2014, and during the leadup to the general election, the approximately weekly reports on the status of the political contracts were reported as at a random time by Exceltium, on a pro bono basis. Exceltium is a Wellington-based corporate and public affairs consultancy, majority owned by right-wing political lobbyist, Matthew Hooton.

The gaming of iPredict by National Party members was specifically noted by Nicky Hager in his book "Dirty Politics", which was released in August 2014.

== Closure ==
On 26 November 2015, iPredict announced it would be winding up its New Zealand operations. According to the company's website, as Associate Minister of Justice Simon Bridges declined an application from iPredict for an exemption to the Anti-Money Laundering and Countering Financing of Terrorism Act, the prediction market was no longer legally able to operate in its current form. Despite the average net worth of an iPredict trader of $41, iPredict noted that Minister Bridges believed the prediction market posed "a legitimate money laundering risk."

In a statement, Bridges said anti-money laundering legislation created obligations for businesses to check customers' identities and report suspicious transactions.

"The main reason for declining the application was that Predictions Clearing Limited [iPredict] does not identify its customers, which creates an opportunity to use the iPredict market to launder illicit funds. The customers can deposit and withdraw funds from their accounts, including from overseas. Deposit restrictions apply, but these can be circumvented by setting up multiple user accounts, as the customers' identities are not verified."

Subsequent to the closure notice date, no new funds or traders were allowed onto the iPredict site, but it continued to operate within the pool of existing accounts and funds still invested, for twelve months. This placed some doubt on its accuracy in predicting the outcomes of political events, for example.

On the evening of 30 November 2016, all trading was suspended, and traders were informed through a website notice, the option of withdrawing funds remaining in their account, or donating the funds to Victoria University. iPredict reported exploring the possibility of "transferring our prediction activities to be included on PredictIt in the US".

== See also ==
- Intrade
- Iowa Electronic Markets
- PredictIt
