= Emotions in decision-making =

One way of thinking holds that the mental process of decision-making is (or should be) rational: a formal process based on optimizing utility. Rational thinking and decision-making does not leave much room for strong emotions. In fact, emotions are often considered irrational occurrences that may distort reasoning.

However, there are presently theories and research for both rational decision-making and emotional decision-making focusing on the important role of emotions in decision-making and the mental process and logic on the important role in rational decision-making.

Loewenstein and Lerner divide emotions during decision-making into two types: those anticipating future emotions and those immediately experienced while deliberating and deciding. Damasio formulated the somatic marker hypothesis (SMH), that proposes a mechanism by which emotional processes can guide (or bias) behavior, particularly decision-making. Pfister and Böhm believe that "the issue of rationality should be based on the validity of emotional evaluations rather than on formal coherence."

== The Loewenstein-Lerner classification ==
=== Anticipated emotions ===
Loewenstein and Lerner divide emotions during decision-making into two types: those anticipating future emotions and those immediately experienced while deliberating and deciding. Anticipated (or expected) emotions are not experienced directly, but are expectations of how the person will feel once gains or losses associated with that decision are experienced. A great deal of research has focused on the risk/return spectrum that is considered in most decisions. For example, students may anticipate regret when deciding which section of a class is best to register for, or participants in a weight-loss plan might anticipate the pleasure they will feel if they lose weight, versus the negative feelings unsuccessful efforts may engender.

Generally, it is the contemplation of incremental losses or gains that generates anticipated emotions in decision-makers, as opposed to their overall condition. This means that an investor who imagines losing a small amount of money will generally focus with disappointment on the lost investment, rather than with pleasure on the overall amount still owned. Similarly, a dieter who anticipates losing two pounds may imagine feeling pleasure even though those two pounds are a very small percentage of what needs to be lost overall.

Also, decision-makers tend to compare a possible result of a decision against what could have happened, rather than to their current state: for instance, game participants who could win $1000 and end up with nothing base their disappointment on the loss of the hoped-for prize, rather than on the fact that they have no less money than they had when they began the game. This process, and the anticipation of such emotion, is referred to as a counterfactual comparison.

Finally, decision-makers tend to weight possible outcomes differently based on the amount of delay between the choice and the outcome. Decisions made with a time delay – intertemporal choice – tend to involve different weights on outcomes depending on their delay, involving hyperbolic discounting and affective forecasting. These effects are then connected to anticipated emotions as the decision is being contemplated.

=== Immediate emotions ===
True emotions experienced while decision-making are termed immediate emotions, integrating cognition with somatic or bodily experienced components within the autonomic nervous system and outward emotional expressions. These may or may not be connected to the decision at hand, however; while contemplation of the decision's consequences may give rise to immediate emotions, known as anticipatory or integral influences, immediate emotions can also be related to the current environment or the dispositional affect of the person. Although unrelated to the decision under consideration, this type of emotion can still impact the decision-making process as an incidental influence.

Immediate emotions tend to operate differently from anticipated emotions. First, when they are intense they tend to negate the probability of the possible outcome; for example, a fear of flying experienced while deciding how to travel may lead a person to choose driving even though air safety statistics would show air travel to be statistically less likely to present a danger. The intense emotions can exact a higher influence on the decision than the probabilities under consideration. Also, immediate emotions can be very sensitive to how vivid the possible outcome is to the decision-maker. Again, a fear of flying may be enhanced by the vividness of the mental image of a plane crash may be in the mind of the decision-maker. Finally, how soon an outcome may happen impacts the related immediate emotions: the sooner the impending possible outcome, the more intense the emotion associated with that event. Overall, these emotions are real, experienced emotions, as opposed to those anticipated while thinking about possible outcomes, and as such can very powerfully impact decision-making.

== Damasio's somatic marker hypothesis ==
The somatic marker hypothesis (SMH), formulated by Antonio Damasio, proposes a mechanism by which emotional processes can guide (or bias) behavior, particularly decision-making.

Emotions, as defined by Damasio, are changes in both body and brain states in response to different stimuli. Physiological changes (e.g., muscle tone, heart rate, endocrine release, posture, facial expression, etc.) occur in the body and are relayed to the brain where they are transformed into an emotion that tells the individual something about the stimulus that they have encountered. Over time, emotions and their corresponding bodily change(s) become associated with particular situations and their past outcomes.

When making decisions, these physiological signals (or ‘somatic markers’) and their evoked emotion are consciously or unconsciously associated with their past outcomes and bias decision-making towards certain behaviors while avoiding others. For instance, when a somatic marker associated with a positive outcome is perceived, the person may feel happy and motivated to pursue that behavior. When a somatic marker associated with the negative outcome is perceived, the person may feel sad and the emotion may act as an internal alarm to warn the individual to avoid a course of action. These situation-specific somatic states based on, and reinforced by, past experiences help to guide behavior in favor of more advantageous choices and therefore are adaptive.

According to the SMH, two distinct pathways reactivate somatic marker responses. In the first pathway, emotion can be evoked by the changes in the body that are projected to the brain—called the "body loop". For instance, encountering a feared object like a snake may initiate the fight-or-flight response and cause fear. In the second pathway, cognitive representations of the emotions can be activated in the brain without being directly elicited by a physiological response—called the "as-if body loop". For instance, imagining an encounter with a snake would initiate a similar flight-or-fight response "as-if" you were in that particular situation (albeit perhaps a much weaker one). In other words, the brain can anticipate expected bodily changes, which allows the individual to respond faster to external stimuli without waiting for an event to actually occur.

According to Dunn, "the somatic marker hypothesis proposes that ‘somatic marker’ biasing signals from the body are represented and regulated in the emotion circuitry of the brain, particularly the ventromedial prefrontal cortex (VMPFC), to help regulate decision-making in situations of complexity and uncertainty". Therefore, in situations of complexity and uncertainty, the marker signals allow the brain to recognise the situation and respond quickly.

== Pfister and Böhm's framework ==
Pfister and Böhm (2008) have developed a classification of how emotions function in decision-making that conceptualizes an integral role for emotions, rather than simply influencing decision-making.

The four roles played by emotions in this framework are:

- Providing information: This includes both positive and negative emotions that arise directly from the options being considered by the decision maker, who can then evaluate choices with this "information." This role is especially likely when the felt emotion is reducible; that is, easily reduced to a simple comparison (for example, attraction and repulsion), and unequivocally positive or negative. Pleasure and displeasure make up the spectrum of these emotions.
- Improving speed: While making a good decision is important, making a quick decision is also important. Therefore, emotions and associated somatic conditions can offer mechanisms for encouraging a decision maker to decide quickly, especially when one or more options are potentially dangerous. Hunger, anger and fear can all induce a speedy decision.
- Assessing relevance: Emotions help decision makers decide whether a certain element of the decision is relevant to their particular situations. Each person's personal history and state(s) of mind leads to a different set of relevant information. The two such emotions most studied to date are regret and disappointment.
- Enhancing commitment: In some ways, making the decision best for the self may be construed "the best" overall. However, acting in the best interests of others is also important in human civilization, and moral sentiments, or emotions, serve to help decision makers commit to such a decision rather than being drawn back toward pure self-interest. Emotions such as guilt and love help decision makers make such commitments.

This framework can help in exploring such concepts as ambivalence, tendencies toward particular types of action, and sustaining difficult choices over time.

== Positive and negative emotions ==
Research done by Isen and Patrick put forth the theory of "mood maintenance" which states that happy decision-makers are reluctant to gamble. In other words, happy people decide against gambling, since they would not want to undermine the happy feeling.

Alternatively, the influence of negative feelings at the time of decision-making was studied by Raghunathan and Tuan Pham (1999). They conducted three experiments in gambling decisions and job selection decisions, where unhappy subjects were found to prefer high-risk/high-reward options unlike anxious subjects who preferred low-risk/low-reward options. They stated that "anxiety and sadness convey distinct types of information to the decision-maker and prime different goals." It was found that "while anxiety primes an implicit goal of uncertainty reduction, sadness primes an implicit goal of reward replacement". Thus emotions cannot simply be classified as positive or negative as we need to consider the consequences of the emotions in ultimate decision-making.

== State-dependent remembering ==
Another important factor is the memory of events in decision making. The mood someone has works as "a retrieval cue" whereby happy feelings make positive materials come to mind which in turn have great impact on the decisions that are made. The same is true of negative feelings. Bower coined the term state-dependent remembering for this phenomenon. Bower and others stated that emotions and feelings cannot be extracted from the human mind. The emotions felt in a particular situation will be recorded in the emotional memory and can be activated when the person faces a similar situation or has to make a difficult decision in a short period of time. Often the decision maker is unaware of previous experiences in similar situations.

== Impact ==
Much research has been conducted on the various impacts of emotion on decision-making. Studies indicate the complexity and breadth of those impacts. Listed below are some examples of their results.

- Decision-makers who were made to consider safety concerns that induced negative emotions when deciding which car to purchase, were more likely to "choose not to choose," or to stick with the status quo.
- Study participants who experienced "frustrated anger" were more likely to choose a high risk, high reward option in a lottery – a choice the authors categorize as "self-defeating."
- "Fearful people made pessimistic judgments of future events whereas angry people made optimistic judgements."
- Study participants who had been induced to feel sad were likely to set a lower selling price for an item they were asked to sell; the researchers suggest that selling the item would bring about a change in the participants’ circumstances and thus perhaps a positive change in mood.
- Participants with "normal emotion processing" were engaged in a card-drawing task. When drawing from "dangerous decks" and consequently experiencing losses and the associated negative emotions, they subsequently made safer and more lucrative choices. Participants with brain damage that had left them unable to experience such emotional responses, did not change their behavior in this way.

== See also ==
- Affective forecasting
- Emotional bias
- Emotional reasoning
- Emotionally focused therapy § Emotion response types
- Intensity of preference
- Motivated forgetting
- Motivated reasoning
- Motivated sequence
- Motivated tactician
- Optimism
- Pessimism
- The Righteous Mind
