= Measure VY =

Culver City ballot proposition

- Culver City Municipal General Election - Measure VY

Results
| Choice | Votes | % |
|---|---|---|
| Yes | 8,293 | 49.95% |
| No | 8,309 | 50.05% |
| Valid votes | 16,602 | 100.00% |
| Invalid or blank votes | 0 | 0.00% |
| Total votes | 16,602 | 100.00% |
| Registered voters/turnout | 28,162 | 58.95% |

Measure VY, also called Vote 16, was an unsuccessful 2022 ballot initiative in Culver City, California, that sought to allow 16- and 17-year-olds to vote in local elections. The election was the latest in a string of ballot measures in different localities, often supported by a movement called "Vote 16", although the lowered voting age remains rare in the United States. The measure's primary support came from youth activists attending Culver City High School, who contended that 16-year-olds have the mental capacity and vested interest necessary to vote, and that extending suffrage to them would foster participation in the democratic process. The opposition, led by former mayor Steve Gourley, argued that 16-year-olds do not have the maturity necessary to vote; Gourley also stated that the measure was an attempt to throw the city's politics towards the left. The measure failed by only 16 votes, out of over 16,000 cast.

== Text and background ==
The text of the initiative read as follows:

Shall the measure amending the City of Culver City Charter to allow Culver City residents aged 16 and 17, who are otherwise eligible to vote under state and local law, to vote on City and School District candidates and ballot measures, provided that each legislative body has approved budgetary funds and determined logistical systems are in place, and that inclusion would not prevent consolidation of City or School District elections with county elections, be adopted?

Similar initiatives aimed at youth suffrage, often supported by a movement called "Vote 16", (Note: Also a nickname for this specific ballot measure.) have taken place in several other localities as well, with mixed results. Measures were narrowly defeated on the ballot in San Francisco in the 2016, 2018, and 2020 elections, garnering 49.2% on the last try. Measures in Oakland and Berkeley succeeded in 2016 and 2020, respectively, both by over 67% – but Alameda County, which runs the elections for those cities, failed to implement the measure in time for the 2022 general election. The Maryland cities of Greenbelt, Hyattsville, Mount Rainier, Riverdale Park, and Takoma Park all have a voting age of 16. These are the only places in the United States where ballot measures have extended suffrage to 16-year-olds, although U.S. Representative Grace Meng has repeatedly attempted to legislate the issue on a federal level; countries that allow 16-year-olds to vote include Argentina, Austria, and Malta.

== Campaign ==
=== For ===
The measure was primarily campaigned for by Culver City High School activists, including 17-year-old senior Ada Meighan-Thiel. According to the Los Angeles Times, Meighan-Thiel contends that allowing young people to vote incentivizes them to participate in the system as adults. Meighan-Thiel also argues that young people have a personal stake:

We're voting on climate legislation that's going to stick with us, because we're going to be inheriting this planet. We're voting on gun reform laws, as we're in classrooms every day. We're voting on housing because we'd like to be able to afford our homes in the future.

Other supporters for the measure say that if 16-year-olds can work and pay taxes, they have a vested interest in laws they cannot vote on. On the issue of maturity, Meighan-Thiel cites a study from National Institutes of Health that differentiates between "cold" and "hot cognition", the difference between lengthy rational and heat-of-the-moment decision-making. According to the study, 16-year-olds are just as capable of the former, while the latter does not fully develop until later in life.

The measure was supported by Daniel Lee, the incumbent mayor of Culver City, as well as a nonpartisan organization called Generation Citizen and the Los Angeles County Democratic Party.

=== Against ===
The opposition was spearheaded by Democratic former mayor Steve Gourley, who also served on the city council and local school board. Gourley charged that "so-called progressives" were attempting to gain control of Culver City politics. On his website, he lists two former mayors as opposed to the measure. Opposition also worried that the teenagers could be too young and inexperienced to vote, a concern Gourley said was reflected in calls he had with teachers and parents. As a five-year-old, Gourley canvassed with his mother; he described himself as a "a very gifted 16 and 17-year-old". But he also said he thought the measure was implausible and expensive, and remarked "would I have really matured enough to know what goes on in the community? I don't think so."

== Results and analysis ==
The initial returns for Measure VY leaned against enactment – by November 11, returns showed an early count of 4,264 in favor versus 4,918 opposed, a support rate of about 46%. As more votes were counted, the margin of victory shrank drastically. By December 1, 49.99% of votes counted were in favor, a shortage of only three votes. In the final returns, Measure VY failed by a margin of 16 votes.

After the results were certified, CBS Los Angeles reported that according to experts, the measure should give more voters more reason to cast their ballots. Matt Lesenyie, an Assistant Professor of Political Science at California State University, Long Beach, remarked, "to see a result that is so razor thin, just makes me think that somebody has to be sitting at home regretting that they didn't vote in that election. That they literally would have made a difference."
