= Ziva Kunda =

Israeli social psychologist

Ziva Kunda

Ziva Kunda (Hebrew: זיוה קונדה; June 13, 1955 – February 24, 2004) was an Israeli social psychologist and professor at the University of Waterloo known for her work in social cognition and motivated reasoning. Her seminal paper "The Case for Motivated Reasoning", published in Psychological Bulletin in 1990, posthumously received the Scientific Impact Award from the Society of Experimental Social Psychology. Kunda authored the book Social Cognition: Making Sense of People.

== Biography ==
Ziva Kunda was born in Tel Aviv. Her parents were from Oudtshoorn, a small South African town. They immigrated from different parts of Europe to Oudtshoorn to find safety from the persecutions of Jews before and during World War II. In Kunda's autobiography, she shares her parents' background, their parents, and her early childhood. In 2004, Kunda died from cancer. She is survived by her husband Paul Thagard, a professor of philosophy at the University of Waterloo, and two sons.

== Academic career ==
Kunda obtained her PhD and MA in psychology in 1985 at the University of Michigan, and her BA in Psychology at the Hebrew University in 1978. Directly after finishing her PhD, she became an assistant professor at Princeton University in the Psychology Department. In 1992, she moved to Waterloo, Ontario, where she was associate professor of psychology at the University of Waterloo. In 1997, she became a full professor. Kunda's profile on the Social Psychology Network is actively maintained by social psychologist Scott Plous, in order to provide a resource for those interested in Kunda's work.

== Research and publications ==
=== Motivated reasoning ===
Kunda's 1990 article, "The Case for Motivated Reasoning," outlines a comprehensive set of research and theory to provide evidence that motivations for a desired outcome affect the process of reasoning, including the formation of impressions, determining one's beliefs and attitudes, evaluating evidence, and making decisions. She makes a distinction between two major categories of the phenomena: accuracy-oriented motivated reasoning and goal-oriented motivated reasoning.

Kunda provides evidence to support accuracy-oriented motivated reasoning in which people expend more cognitive effort in the reasoning process when they are motivated to be accurate in making a judgment, such as when they expect to be evaluated, must justify their decision to others, expect to make their judgements public, or when their decisions affect another person's life. People who are motivated by accuracy spend more time considering the relevant information and rely less on cognitive shortcuts and strategies such as heuristics.

Kunda focuses the majority of the evidence for motivated reasoning on directional or goal-oriented motivated reasoning in which cognitive processes used to justify reasoning or judgement are biased by the motivation to reach a desired conclusion. Kunda writes that directional goals "affect reasoning by affecting which information will be considered in the reasoning process". She summarizes research indicating how directional goals may bias three cognitive reasoning processes:

1. Accessing and construction of beliefs about the self, other people, and events. Kunda highlights the effects of motivation on memory search for pre-existing beliefs and self-knowledge as related to a desired attitude about oneself, others, and events or tasks. Examples include: the motivation to reduce cognitive dissonance, a desired an outcome that depends in some way on another person (i.e., outcome dependency), and the desirability for a particular outcome of some event (e.g., sporting match).
2. Use of inferential rules. Kunda references studies that point to the phenomena that directional goals can lead people to use certain statistical heuristics to support their judgements. For example, people will the use the base rate information (or the representativeness heuristic) in the reasoning process when it aligns with the directional goal or desired judgment.
3. Evaluation of scientific evidence by biasing the selection of both beliefs and rules. Kunda provides evidence to demonstrate how people's desire to believe or not believe scientific information affects the recruitment of prior beliefs and inferential rules about the information. For example, when the scientific evidence indicates that a behavior is unhealthy, those who engage in that behavior will deem that information weaker than those who do not engage in the behavior.

Kunda concludes that when one is motivated towards a particular conclusion or outcome, one feels obligated to construct a justification, and in doing so, they only access a biased subset of relevant beliefs and rules to arrive at that desired result.

=== Social cognition ===
In 1999, Kunda authored the textbook Social Cognition: Making Sense of People; one of the books she is well known for. In this book, Kunda begins by painting a picture of the birth of social psychology and cognitive psychology. Before the prominence of these fields, psychology was dominated by behavioral psychology which focused on studying only observable human behavior; B. F. Skinner's "black box" framed any internal happenings of the human mind as an enigma that should not be explored. However, Kunda highlights in the book how, with the rise of the study of cognition in the 1950s and beyond due to the increase of technological research tools (fMRI, EEG, etc.), cognitive scientists began to break down the barriers to understanding human cognition. Kunda covers many topics in the book, from stereotyping and emotional effects on cognition to judgements and behavior. She points out that the topic of social cognition, unique in that most humans have interacted with other humans and therefore have many personal experiences with this research field, collects many presumptions from "lay people" and psychologists alike. Kunda therefore emphasizes not only what the theories of social cognition are, but also how the theories and empirical findings were developed to highlight efficacy.

Kunda wrote as an overview of her research:

One line of my work examines how stereotypes are activated, used, and modified. Under what circumstances, for example, will the stereotypes of an ethnic or an occupational group come to mind as one is interacting with a member of these groups? How will a person's behavior influence which of the stereotypes relevant to that person are on one's mind? Under what circumstances will relevant stereotypes influence one's evaluation of a person? Another line of my work examines how outstanding individuals influence people's self-views and motivation. When will a superstar give rise to inspiration and self-enhancement, and when to discouragement and self-deflation?

This contextual understanding of how people stereotype added a new dimension to this body of work. Specifically, Kunda's work with Stephen Spencer looked at temporal aspects of stereotyping in their paper "When Do Stereotypes Come to Mind and When Do They Color Judgment?" They found that when someone is engaging with another individual in a stereotyped group, that person is not always thinking about the group's stereotype. When they do think about the stereotype, the stereotype does not always play a role in their judgements. Kunda also found that when stereotypes change, they usually do so incrementally or through causal reasoning.

== Legacy ==
Kunda's seminal work on motivated reasoning has influenced several fields of communication research including: media framing, risk communication, public opinion, political communication, misinformation, social media effects, science communication, and climate change communication.

== See also ==
- List of University of Waterloo people
- Confirmation bias
- Hot cognition
- Motivated tactician
