= Ladera Heights, California =

Census-designated place in California, United States

- Unincorporated community Census designated place
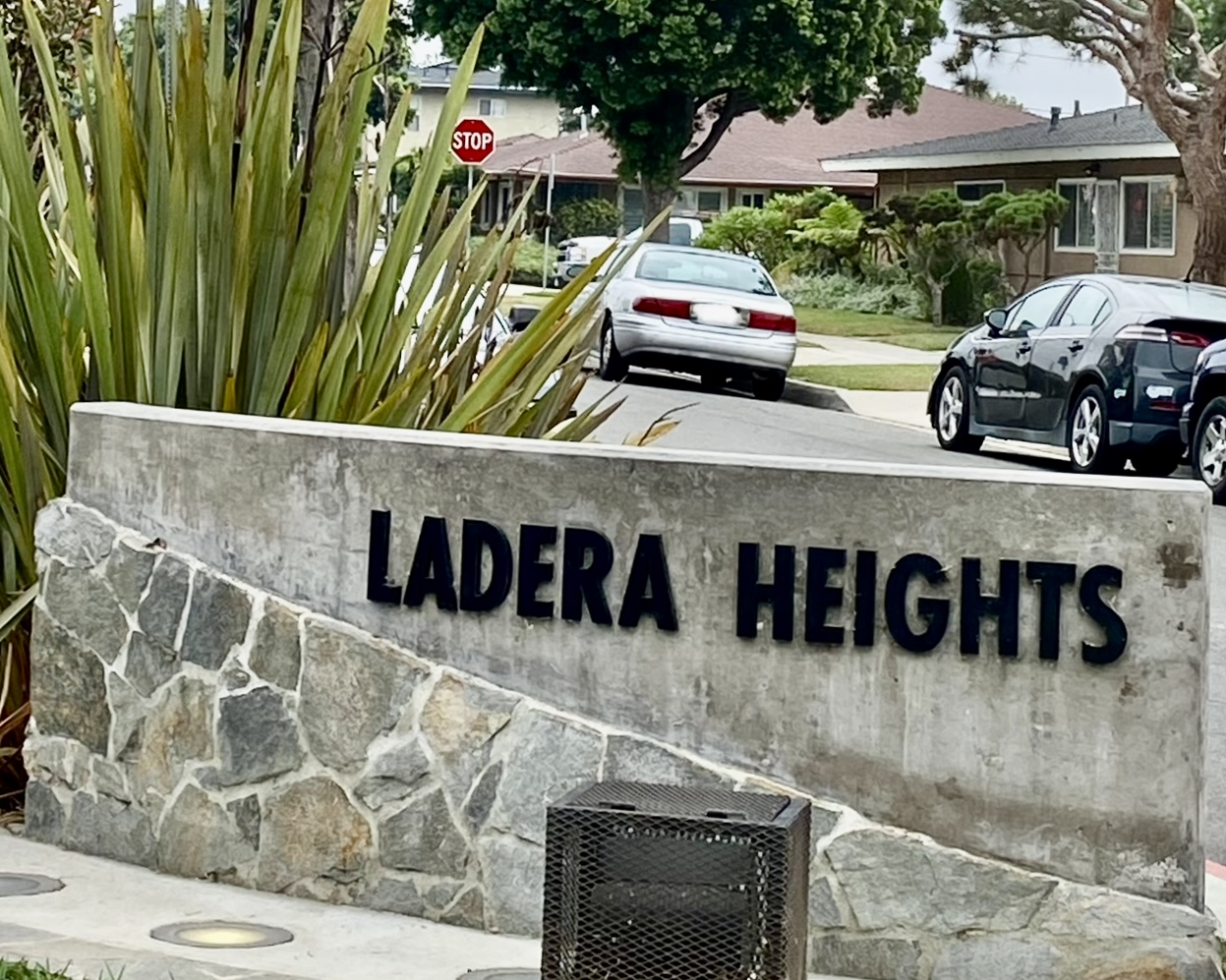
- Ladera Heights community sign
- Nickname: "The Black Beverly Hills"
- Location of Ladera Heights in Los Angeles County, California

- Location in the United States
- Coordinates: 33°59′20″N 118°22′27″W
- Country: United States
- State: California
- County: Los Angeles

Area
  - Total: 2.965 sq mi (7.680 km^{2})
  - Land: 2.965 sq mi (7.680 km^{2})
  - Water: 0 sq mi (0 km^{2}) 0%
- Elevation: 305 ft (93 m)

Population (2020)
  - Total: 6,654
  - Density: 2,244/sq mi (866.4/km^{2})
- Time zone: UTC−8 (PST)
  - Summer (DST): UTC−7 (PDT)
- ZIP Code: 90056
- Area codes: 310/424/323
- FIPS code: 06-39108
- GNIS feature IDs: 1867032, 2408521

Ladera Heights is an unincorporated community and census-designated place in Los Angeles County, California, United States. The population was 6,634 at the 2020 census. Culver City lies to its west, the Baldwin Hills neighborhood to its north, the View Park–Windsor Hills community to its east, the Westchester neighborhood to its south and southwest and the city of Inglewood to its southeast. With an average household income of $132,824, Ladera Heights ranks third amongst the ten wealthiest majority-Black communities in the United States.

== History ==
Ladera Heights originated in the late 1940s with the development of "Old Ladera". In the 1960s, custom homes were built in "New Ladera". Prominent architect builders included Valentine and Gallant. Robert Earl, who designed many of the Valentine homes, went on to build large multimillion-dollar estates throughout Southern California and in other countries. Neighboring Fox Hills contained a golf course with rolling hills that backed up to Wooster Avenue. Valentine built Robert Earl designed homes on Wooster overlooking the Fox Hills golf course.

Baseball player Frank Robinson and other sports players began moving to Ladera Heights in the early 1970s. Many celebrities have lived in Ladera Heights over the years, including Peter Vidmar, Vanessa Williams, Chris Darden, Chris Strait, Lisa Leslie, Olympia Scott, Ken Norton, Arron Afflalo, Tyler, The Creator, Michael Cooper and Byron Scott. Ladera Heights is known as a residence for affluent African Americans.

== Geography ==
According to the United States Census Bureau, the CDP has a total area of 3.0 square miles (7.8 km^{2}), all land.

Most of the area is in unincorporated Los Angeles County, with a small section in the neighborhood of Ladera, within the City of Los Angeles.

Ladera Heights is portioned into three sections, known as "Upper Ladera," "Lower Ladera" and "Old Ladera". Upper Ladera includes all houses north of Slauson between La Cienega Boulevard and Shenandoah Avenue, while Lower Ladera (the larger of the two) consists of all houses south of Slauson between Wooster and La Cienega. Old Ladera is the small area just east of La Cienega and south of Slauson. The Ladera Center, located in Lower Ladera just west of La Cienega Boulevard, hosts a number of local franchise stores and eateries.

== Demographics ==
Historical population
Census	Pop.	Note	%±
1970	6,079		—
1980	6,647		9.3%
1990	6,316		−5.0%
2000	6,568		4.0%
2010	6,498		−1.1%
2020	6,654		2.4%
U.S. Decennial Census; 1850–1870 1880–1890; 1900 1910 1920; 1930 1940 1950; 1960 1970 1980; 1990 2000 2010 2020

=== Racial and ethnic composition ===
Ladera Heights CDP, California – Racial and ethnic composition Note: the US Census treats Hispanic/Latino as an ethnic category. This table excludes Latinos from the racial categories and assigns them to a separate category. Hispanics/Latinos may be of any race.
Race / Ethnicity (NH = Non-Hispanic)	Pop 2000	Pop 2010	Pop 2020	% 2000	% 2010	% 2020
White alone (NH)	1,227	863	1,014	18.68%	13.28%	15.24%
Black or African American alone (NH)	4,602	4,704	4,231	70.07%	72.39%	63.59%
Native American or Alaska Native alone (NH)	17	14	14	0.26%	0.22%	0.21%
Asian alone (NH)	190	228	351	2.89%	3.51%	5.28%
Native Hawaiian or Pacific Islander alone (NH)	4	1	2	0.06%	0.02%	0.03%
Other race alone (NH)	36	33	85	0.55%	0.51%	1.28%
Mixed race or Multiracial (NH)	270	300	451	4.11%	4.62%	6.78%
Hispanic or Latino (any race)	222	355	506	3.38%	4.46%	7.60%
Total	6,568	6,498	6,654	100.00%	100.00%	100.00%

=== 2020 census ===
As of the 2020 census, Ladera Heights had a population of 6,654. The median age was 51.9 years. 13.6% of residents were under the age of 18 and 28.7% of residents were 65 years of age or older. For every 100 females there were 82.6 males, and for every 100 females age 18 and over there were 79.5 males age 18 and over.

100.0% of residents lived in urban areas, while 0.0% lived in rural areas.

There were 2,738 households in Ladera Heights, of which 20.6% had children under the age of 18 living in them. Of all households, 43.3% were married-couple households, 14.9% were households with a male householder and no spouse or partner present, and 36.9% were households with a female householder and no spouse or partner present. About 26.7% of all households were made up of individuals and 15.5% had someone living alone who was 65 years of age or older.

There were 2,873 housing units, of which 4.7% were vacant. The homeowner vacancy rate was 0.2% and the rental vacancy rate was 5.4%.

=== 2010 census ===
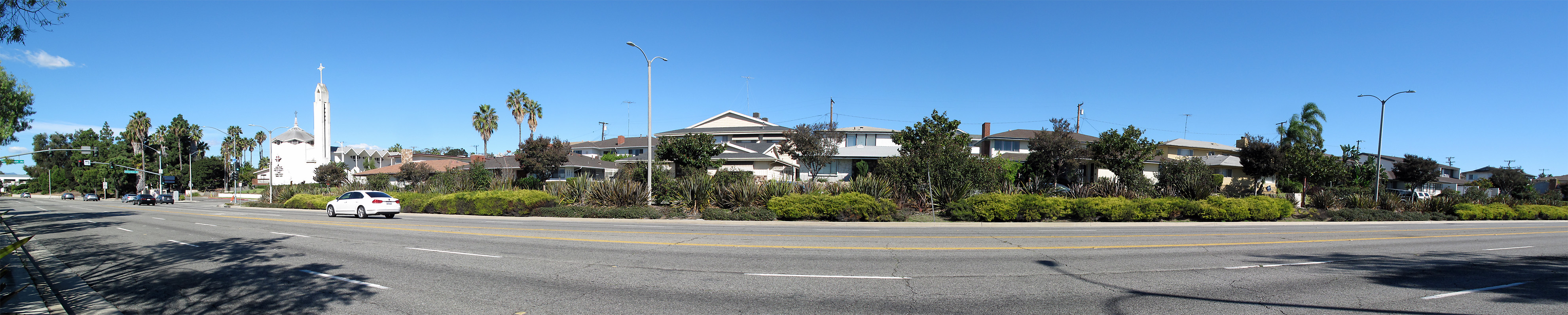
Panoramic view of Slauson Avenue in Ladera Heights from Shenandoah

The 2010 US Census reported that Ladera Heights had a population of 6,498. The population density was 2,191.1 inhabitants per square mile (846.0/km^{2}). The racial makeup of Ladera Heights was 4,786 (73.7%) African American, 979 (15.1%) White (13.3% Non-Hispanic White), 20 (0.3%) Native American, 231 (3.6%) Asian, 2 (0.0%) Pacific Islander, 134 (2.1%) from other races, and 346 (5.3%) from two or more races. Hispanic or Latino of any race were 355 people (5.5%).

The census reported that 6,486 people (99.8% of the population) lived in households, 8 (0.1%) lived in non-institutionalized group quarters, and 4 (0.1%) were institutionalized.

There were 2,751 households, 702 (25.5%) had children under the age of 18 living in them, 1,240 (45.1%) were opposite-sex married couples living together, 462 (16.8%) had a female householder with no husband present, 113 (4.1%) had a male householder with no wife present. There were 93 (3.4%) unmarried opposite-sex partnerships, and 20 (0.7%) same-sex married couples or partnerships. 778 households (28.3%) were one person and 351 (12.8%) had someone living alone who was 65 or older. The average household size was 2.36. There were 1,815 families (66.0% of households); the average family size was 2.88.

The age distribution was 1,122 people (17.3%) under the age of 18, 401 people (6.2%) aged 18 to 24, 1,264 people (19.5%) aged 25 to 44, 2,183 people (33.6%) aged 45 to 64, and 1,528 people (23.5%) who were 65 or older. The median age was 49.0 years. For every 100 females, there were 79.7 males. For every 100 females age 18 and over, there were 75.1 males.

There were 2,867 housing units at an average density of 966.7 per square mile, of the occupied units 2,027 (73.7%) were owner-occupied and 724 (26.3%) were rented. The homeowner vacancy rate was 1.1%; the rental vacancy rate was 6.7%. 4,891 people (75.3% of the population) lived in owner-occupied housing units and 1,595 people (24.5%) lived in rental housing units.

=== Income and poverty ===
According to a 2014 ranking, Ladera Heights ranks #3 among the top 10 richest majority-Black communities in the US, just under View Park-Windsor Hills, CA, and the Baldwin Hills neighborhood of Los Angeles, and just above Mitchellville, Maryland. Per the study, Ladera Heights has an average family income of $132,824. During 2009–2013, Ladera Heights had a median household income of $99,563, with 4.7% of the population living below the federal poverty line.

=== 2000 census ===
At the 2000 census there were 6,568 people, 2,691 households, and 1,883 families residing in the census-designated place (CDP). The population density was 2,230.6 inhabitants per square mile (861.2/km^{2}). There were 2,755 housing units at an average density of 935.7 per square mile (361.3/km^{2}). The racial makeup of the CDP was 70.8% African American, 7.0% White, 2.9% Asian, 0.3% Native American, 0.1% Pacific Islander, 1.4% from other races, and 4.5% from two or more races. Hispanic or Latino of any race were 3.4%. English and German were the most common ancestries. Canada and Trinidad were the most common foreign places of birth.

Of the 2,691 households 26.5% had children under the age of 18 living with them, 51.0% were married couples living together, 15.7% had a female householder with no husband present, and 30.0% were non-families. 24.8% of households were one person and 9.1% were one person aged 65 or older. The average household size was 2.44 and the average family size was 2.89.

The age distribution was 20.7% under the age of 18, 5.4% from 18 to 24, 24.5% from 25 to 44, 29.8% from 45 to 64, and 19.5% 65 or older. The median age was 44 years. For every 100 females, there were 81.9 males. For every 100 females age 18 and over, there were 77.7 males.

The median household income was $90,233 and the median family income was $103,174. Males had a median income of $64,643 versus $52,750 for females. The per capita income for the CDP was $47,798. About 1.1% of families and 3.7% of the population were below the poverty line, including 2.5% of those under age 18 and 5.9% of those age 65 or over.

== Education ==
=== Primary and secondary schools ===
Most of Ladera Heights is served by the Inglewood Unified School District. The schools serving Ladera Heights are in the Inglewood city limits. As of 2006 fewer than 400 Ladera Heights residents attended Inglewood USD schools. La Tijera School (K-8) and Parent School (K-8) serve Ladera Heights. La Tijera and Parent feed into Inglewood High School.

In 2006, a group of residents petitioned to move the area into the Culver City Unified School District of Culver City. Both the Culver City USD and the Inglewood USD opposed the move.

As of 2014 the Wiseburn School District allows parents in Ladera Heights to send their children to Wiseburn schools on inter-district transfers.

=== Colleges and universities ===
West Los Angeles College, a community college, is in Ladera Heights.

== Services ==
Ladera Heights receives fire protection from the Los Angeles County Fire Department.

The Los Angeles County Sheriff's Department (LASD) operates the Marina del Rey Station in Marina del Rey, serving Ladera Heights.

The Los Angeles County Department of Health Services SPA 5 West Area Health Office serves Ladera Heights.

== Government ==
In the California State Legislature, Ladera Heights is in the 28th senatorial district, represented by Democrat Lola Smallwood-Cuevas, and in the 55th Assembly district, represented by Democrat Isaac Bryan.

In the United States House of Representatives, Ladera Heights is in California's 37th congressional district, represented by Democrat Sydney Kamlager-Dove.

== Parks and recreation ==
Ladera Park is adjacent to the View Park-Windsor Hills and the City of Inglewood. The park has an outdoor amphitheatre, a baseball–softball diamond field, a basketball court, children's play areas, a community recreation center, water fountains, picnic areas with barbecue grills and tennis courts.

== Retail commerce ==
Ladera Heights Shopping Center (at the northwest side of the junction of La Tijera, La Cienega, and Centinela boulevards).Built in 1965, it hosted a Henshey's Department Store from 1966 to 1990 a Ralphs and what was popularly known as Magic Johnson Starbucks and TGI Friday, a Starbucks and TGI Fridays owned by businessman Magic Johnson from 1998 to 2018. It also has many food options such as Dave's Hot Chicken and Fatburger

== Notable people ==
- Arron Afflalo
- Jhené Aiko
- Chris Darden
- Randy Gardner
- Lisa Leslie
- Ken Norton
- Frank Robinson
- Byron Scott
- Olympia Scott
- Chris Strait
- Tyler, The Creator
- Peter Vidmar
- Jerry West
