= Emotional bias =

Distortion in cognition

An emotional bias is a distortion in cognition and decision making due to emotional factors.

For example, a person might be inclined:

- to attribute negative judgements to neutral events or objects;
- to believe something that has a positive emotional effect, that gives a pleasant feeling, even if there is evidence to the contrary;
- to be reluctant to accept hard facts that are unpleasant and give mental suffering.

== Effect of dispositional emotionality ==
Emotional bias is often the effect of dispositional emotionality that an individual has before the occurrence of events that could cause these emotions. These states were linked to the dysregulation in opioid receptor systems and are commonly known as temperament traits The examples are dispositional dysphoria, irritability, withdrawal, or dispositional good and relaxed moods. These dispositions create emotional biases in cognition. Studies of meaning attribution in 24 groups contrasted by various temperament traits showed that people with high neuroticism, high emotionality and weak endurance perceived neutral abstract concepts more negatively than people with low neuroticism and strong endurance.

== Other effects ==
Effects of emotional biases can be similar to those of a cognitive bias, it can even be considered as a subcategory of such biases. The specificity is that the cause lies in one's desires or fears, which divert the attention of the person, more than in one's reasoning.

Neuroscience experiments have shown how emotions and cognition, which are present in different areas of the human brain, interfere with each other in decision making process, resulting often in a primacy of emotions over reasoning

Emotional bias might help explain the tendency towards over-optimism or over-pessimism, even when evidence for a more rational conclusion is available.

== Emotional attention bias ==
=== Influences ===
==== Sleep ====
Emotional attention bias can be influenced by sleep. Studies have been performed and have shown that sleep deprivation in children reduces their ability to adjust their behavior in emotional situations. Children showed high emotional attention biases when deprived of sleep. This occurs because sleep prepares the body for emotional challenges.

== Decision making ==
Emotions have a small to large impact on the decisions we make depending on the type of emotion. Some of the most influential emotions for decision-making are sadness, disgust, and guilt. Anger differs the most from fear and sadness in both judgment and decision-making contexts. Fear is associated with uncertainty, while sadness is associated with a perception that outcomes are due to the situation. Angry decision-makers tend to make choices quickly and are unlikely to analyze their decisions. Stress can play a role in decision-making. Acute stress can alter the response to moral dilemmas. On the other hand, stress does not always alter everyday, moral decision-making. One study looked at the role emotions play in adolescents' moral decision-making. In a hypothetical, prosocial behavioral context, positively charged self-evaluative emotions most strongly predict moral choice. In anti-social behaviors, negatively charged, critical emotions most strongly predict moral choice. Regret and disappointment are emotions experienced after a decision. In some cases, regret has created a stronger desire to switch choices than disappointment.

Emotions affect different types of decisions. Emotions have a strong influence on economic behavior and decision-making. In some behavioral anomalies, certain emotions related to some tasks can have an increased impact. In one experiment, researchers looked at what emotions manifest the disposition effect, where individuals sell winning shares and hold losing ones. They found that elation for winners and regret for losers are necessary emotions that can cause the effect to occur. In regards to patients making a medical decision, emotions and one's motivational goals, play a part as well. One study looked at the elements of coping behaviors. The first two elements have to do with the need to control the cognitive and emotional elements of the health threat; the second pair of elements relate to the management of cognitive and emotional aspects of the decision itself.

Brain damage can cause changes in normal decision-making processes. The amygdala is an area in the brain involved in emotion. Studies have found that patients with bilateral amygdala damage, which is damage in both hemispheres of the amygdala region in the brain, are deficient in decision-making. When an initial choice is made in decision-making, the result of this choice has an emotional response, which is controlled by the amygdala.

== See also ==
- Conformity
- Emotional reasoning
- Emotions in decision making
- Wishful thinking
