= Paul Thagard =

Canadian philosopher (born 1950)

Paul Thagard FRSC
- Born: Paul Richard Thagard; 28 September 1950 (age 76); Yorkton, Saskatchewan, Canada
- Spouse: Ziva Kunda (died 2004)

Education
- Education: University of Saskatchewan (B.A., 1971) University of Cambridge (M.A., 1973) University of Toronto (Ph.D., 1977) University of Michigan (M.S., 1985)
- Thesis: Explanation and Scientific Inference (1977)
- Doctoral advisor: T. A. Goudge; Bas van Fraassen

Philosophical work
- Era: Contemporary philosophy
- Region: Western philosophy
- School: Naturalism; Epistemic coherentism
- Main interests: Philosophy of mind Cognitive science Philosophy of science
- Notable ideas: Explanatory coherence

Paul Richard Thagard FRSC (/ˈθeɪɡɑːrd/; born 1950) is a Canadian philosopher who specializes in cognitive science, philosophy of mind, and the philosophy of science and medicine. Thagard is a professor emeritus of philosophy at the University of Waterloo. He is a writer, and has contributed to research in analogy and creativity, inference, cognition in the history of science, and the role of emotion in cognition.

In the philosophy of science, Thagard is cited for his work on the use of computational models in explaining conceptual revolutions; his most distinctive contribution to the field is the concept of explanatory coherence, which he has applied to historical cases. He is heavily influenced by pragmatists like C. S. Peirce, and has contributed to the refinement of the idea of inference to the best explanation.

In the philosophy of mind, he is known for his attempts to apply connectionist models of coherence to theories of human thought and action. He is also known for HOTCO ("hot coherence"), which was his attempt to create a computer model of cognition that incorporated emotions at a fundamental level.

In his general approach to philosophy, Thagard is sharply critical of analytic philosophy for being overly dependent upon intuitions as a source of evidence.

== Biography ==
Thagard was born in Yorkton, Saskatchewan on September 28, 1950. He is a graduate of the Universities of Saskatchewan (B.A. in philosophy, 1971), Cambridge (M.A. in philosophy, 1973), Toronto (Ph.D. in philosophy, 1977) and Michigan (M.S. in computer science, 1985).

He was Chair of the Governing Board of the Cognitive Science Society , 1998–1999, and President of the Society for Machines and Mentality , 1997–1998. In 2013 he won a Canada Council Killam Prize, and in 1999 was elected a fellow of the Royal Society of Canada. In 2003, he received a University of Waterloo Award for Excellence in Research, and in 2005 he was named a University Research Chair.

Thagard was married to the psychologist Ziva Kunda. Kunda died in 2004.

== Philosophical work ==
=== Explanatory coherence ===
Thagard has proposed that many cognitive functions—including perception, analogy, explanation, decision-making, and planning—can be modeled as coherence-based constraint satisfaction processes rather than as purely deductive or probabilistic reasoning.

Thagard (together with Karsten Verbeurgt) put forth a formalization of coherence as a constraint satisfaction problem. In this model, coherence operates over a set of representational elements (such as propositions or images) that may either fit together (cohere) or resist fitting together (incohere).

Pairs of elements are linked by either positive or negative constraints. If two elements $p$ and $q$ cohere, they are connected by a positive constraint $(p,q) \in C^+$; if they incohere, they are connected by a negative constraint $(p,q) \in C^-$. Constraints are weighted, such that for each constraint $(p,q) \in C^+ \cup C^-$ there is an associated positive weight $w(p,q)$.

According to Thagard, coherence maximization involves partitioning elements into accepted ($A$) and rejected ($R$) sets so as to satisfy the maximum number, or maximum total weight, of constraints. A positive constraint $(p,q)$ is satisfied if both elements are accepted ($p,q \in A$) or both rejected ($p,q \in R$). A negative constraint $(p,q)$ is satisfied if one element is accepted and the other rejected (for example, $p \in A$ and $q \in R$). This formulation treats reasoning as a global optimization process over interconnected representations rather than as a sequence of local logical inferences.

=== Philosophy of science ===
Thagard worked on the demarcation problem in philosophy of science. Faced with the failure of verifiability and falsifiability, what he called "post positivist depression", he proposed in 1978 a criterion to define pseudoscience, with the broader goal being rescuing science from the relativism of Feyerabend and Rorty. According to Thagard's criterion, "A theory which purports to be scientific is pseudoscientific if and only if":

1. It has been less progressive than alternative theories over a long period of time, and faces many unsolved problems; but
2. The community of practitioners makes little attempt to develop the theory towards solutions of the problems, shows no concern for attempts to evaluate the theory in relation to others, and is selective in considering confirmations and disconfirmations.

However, in 1988, Thagard wrote that this proposal should "be abandoned," because it had two flaws. Firstly it was hopeless to attempt to find necessary and sufficient conditions for pseudoscience in general, and secondly, the criterion was too soft on astrology which it was specifically meant to brand as pseudoscience. Nonetheless, Thagard, didn't completely abandon his criterion, but instead incorporated it into his new solution to the demarcation problem, which he called "Profile of Science and Pseudoscience", a collection of psychological, historical and logical characteristics, against which a discipline could be compared and categorized as either science or pseudoscience. This process, though not "strict necessary or sufficient", could fulfill the normative goals of science, or what Thagard prefers to call "Natural philosophy", by relying "on descriptions of how everyday and scientific reasoning actually works."

Profiles of Science and Pseudoscience
Science	Pseudoscience
Uses correlation thinking.	Uses resemblance thinking.
Seeks empirical confirmations.	Neglects empirical matters.
Practitioners care about evaluating theories in relation to alternative theories	Practitioners oblivious to alternative theories.
Uses highly consilient and simple theories.	Nonsimple theories: many ad hoc hypotheses.
Progresses over time: develops new theories that explain new facts.	Stagnant in doctrine and application.

He describes the Aristotelian realist philosophy of mathematics as "the current philosophy of mathematics that fits best with what is known about minds and science."

== Major works ==
Thagard is the author/co-author of 17 books and over 200 articles.

- Dreams, Jokes, and Songs: How Brains Build Consciousness. (Oxford University Press, 2025).
- Falsehoods Fly: Why Misinformation Spreads and How to Stop it. (Columbia University Press, 2024).
- Balance: How it Works and What it Means. (Columbia University Press, 2022).
- Bots and Beasts: What Make Machines, Animals, and People Smart? (MIT Press, 2021).
- Brain-Mind: From Neurons to Consciousness and Creativity. (Oxford University Press, 2019).
- Mind-Society: From Brains to Social Sciences and Professions. (Oxford University Press, 2019).
- Thagard, Paul (2019). Natural Philosophy: From Social Brains to Knowledge, Reality, Morality, and Beauty. New York: Oxford University Press. ISBN 9780190686444.
- The Cognitive Science of Science: Explanation, Discovery, and Conceptual Change. (MIT Press, 2012).
- The Brain and the Meaning of Life Princeton University Press, 2010 ISBN 978-1-4008-3461-7
- Hot Thought: Mechanisms and Applications of Emotional Cognition (MIT Press, August, 2006, ISBN 0-262-20164-X)
- Coherence in Thought and Action (MIT Press, 2000, ISBN 0-262-20131-3)
- How Scientists Explain Disease (Princeton University Press, 1999, ISBN 0-691-00261-4)
- Mind: An Introduction to Cognitive Science (MIT Press, 1996; second edition, 2005, ISBN 0-262-20154-2)(Trad. esp.: La mente, Buenos Aires/Madrid, Katz editores S.A, 2008, ISBN 978-84-96859-21-0)
- Conceptual Revolutions (Princeton University Press, 1992, ISBN 0-691-02490-1)
- Computational Philosophy of Science (MIT Press, 1988, Bradford Books, 1993, ISBN 0-262-70048-4)

And co-author of:

- Mental Leaps: Analogy in Creative Thought (MIT Press, 1995, ISBN 0-262-08233-0)
- Induction: Processes of Inference, Learning, and Discovery (MIT Press, 1986, Bradford Books, 1989, ISBN 0-262-58096-9)

He is also editor of:

- Philosophy of Psychology and Cognitive Science (North-Holland, 2006, ISBN 0-444-51540-2).

== See also ==
- Computational-representational understanding of mind
- Massimo Pigliucci
- Lee McIntyre
