= Chris Strait =

American comedian and writer (born 1976)

Christopher Alan Strait (born January 14, 1976) is an American comedian and writer. He is best known for being a regular contributor to TruTV's World's Dumbest..., and releasing several stand-up comedy specials on multiple platforms.

== Comedy ==
Strait has headlined over 50 comedy clubs in the U.S. and Canada, and has also performed for the U.S. military in the US, as well as in Cuba, Japan, Bahrain and Germany. "I've been to all 50 states, as well as 6 continents, and over 50 countries. I've done casinos, cruises, corporates, private parties, bars, comedy clubs, colleges, and military bases. Pretty much all the categories of places one can do stand-up." After many years hiatus from international shows, Strait performed in South Africa in 2017. He has also worked as a private auctioneer. From 2018 to 2020, and 2021 onward, Strait has been primarily performing on cruise ships... but shifted to do over 100 virtual shows for private companies during the COVID-19 pandemic. In 2023–24, he headlined clubs in Iceland, Ireland, Switzerland, Austria, and Brazil.

In addition to his contributions on TRU-TV, Strait has also done commentary on E!, ESPN, and Fuel TV. He has performed stand-up comedy several times on Fox's "Laughs", as well as single performances on NickMom, Playboy TV, and Starz. He also wrote/produced/starred in a series of video sketches for YouTube. In 2026, he appeared on Comics Unleashed on CBS.

Strait has also lent his voice to video games, industrials, and film trailers. He was a writer for 'National Lampoon's Sports Minute', and appeared in the National Lampoon Film, "Lost Reality 2".

His first commercially available CD, "Hitting The Wall", was shot in Indianapolis in Oct of 2011, and released on Next Round Entertainment's label, on December 13, 2011. His first commercially available DVD, "Urban Suburbanite" was released on Amazon in September 2015. The special had been shot nearly 3 years earlier, at the Comedy & Magic Club in Hermosa Beach, CA but production issues delayed its release. It was rereleased on Tubi in 2022, and Fawesome in 2024. Strait released two more stand-up comedy CDs in 2019: "Incorrect Correctness" and "Personal Growth" for BSeenMedia. His Dry Bar Comedy Special "Laugh Till You Run Out of Air" was released in January 2020. It was also picked up by Tubi in 2023. Strait then released an Open Bar Comedy Special, “Big and Raw” in 2025.

== Writing ==
Strait has also written and self-released several e-books. Two books on boxing, "Strait on Boxing", and "Boxing Lists For the Die-Hard Fan", as well as a food review book, entitled "Eating Los Angeles". He has also released three books of poetry, "Free Thinker", "Tongues Lenguas", and "High-Cool" under the pen name, Alan Kimble, in 2016, 2019, and 2020, respectively. The last one was a dedicated book of haiku, written during the 2020 COVID-19 quarantine. In September 2016, he released a travel essay book, entitled "40 Years, 50 States". He also released several books in 2019, "Borderless", a travel journal; "Psychology of Humor" and "Empty Bucket", the latter being his personal memoirs, told via bucket-list format.

Strait is also a US presidential historian. He released two books in 2022: "Presidentially Speaking", a comedic take on all 45 US Presidents, and "Strait Democracy", which is a proposed new constitution. In 2024, he released “Fast Food: Slow Digestion” a humorous review of fast food chains.

== Personal ==
Strait was born in Inglewood, California, and grew up in the Ladera Heights section of Los Angeles near Baldwin Hills. He is the older of two sons, and also has a half-sister (from father's side). Strait is of predominately English and German descent, although he claims to be a "European mutt".

He graduated from Culver City High School in 1994, and subsequently earned a bachelor's degree in history from California State University, Dominguez Hills in 1999. Strait then received his master's degree in psychology from Antioch University in 2001. He had intended to be a psychotherapist, but was told by supervisors that his problem-solving style was "too aggressive".

He began his comedy career while still in graduate school, in the summer of 2000. His Masters Thesis was on the subject of humor. Early influences included Mel Brooks, Bill Cosby, Bob Newhart, and The Smothers Brothers. Later his admiration shifted to the likes of George Carlin, Bill Hicks, Richard Pryor, and Louis CK. In addition to his comedy career, Strait has also been employed in real estate, finance, behavioral therapy, and journalism.

Strait has been married twice. First, in 2004, to home stager Mary Beth (McGovern) Strait, (1971-2026). He has a daughter (born 2007), and a son (born 2011) from that union. They divorced in 2017. He and his second wife, urban gardener Lidia Pareno, married in December 2019. They also have a son (born 2018).

Strait is a polyglot, and has an intermediate proficiency in Spanish, Italian, and German.

== Boxing ==
Strait has worked as a live commentator and ring announcer for professional boxing shows, most notably on CBS Sports Network, VYRE, UFC Fight Pass, and Triller TV when it was FITE TV. He has been a freelance boxing writer, blogger, and vlogger since 2000. He has written for cyberboxingzone.com, boxingcentral.com, boxingtalk.com, ropeadoperadio.com, and Boxing Digest magazine. He was the head boxing writer for convictedartist.com and Punch Drunk Sports, and has also hosted several of his own boxing podcasts.

Strait also competed as a boxer, fighting in over 100 underground matches, between the ages of 9 and 17. He also won an official USA Boxing-sanctioned Los Angeles area tournament in the Super Heavyweight (over 201 lbs) elite division in 2001. Extremely nearsighted, he was unable to obtain a professional license. He returned sporadically over the years, fighting in “masters” and “point boxing” tournaments.
