= Ladera, Los Angeles =

Neighborhood in Los Angeles, California, United States

Coordinates: 33.998°N 118.373°W

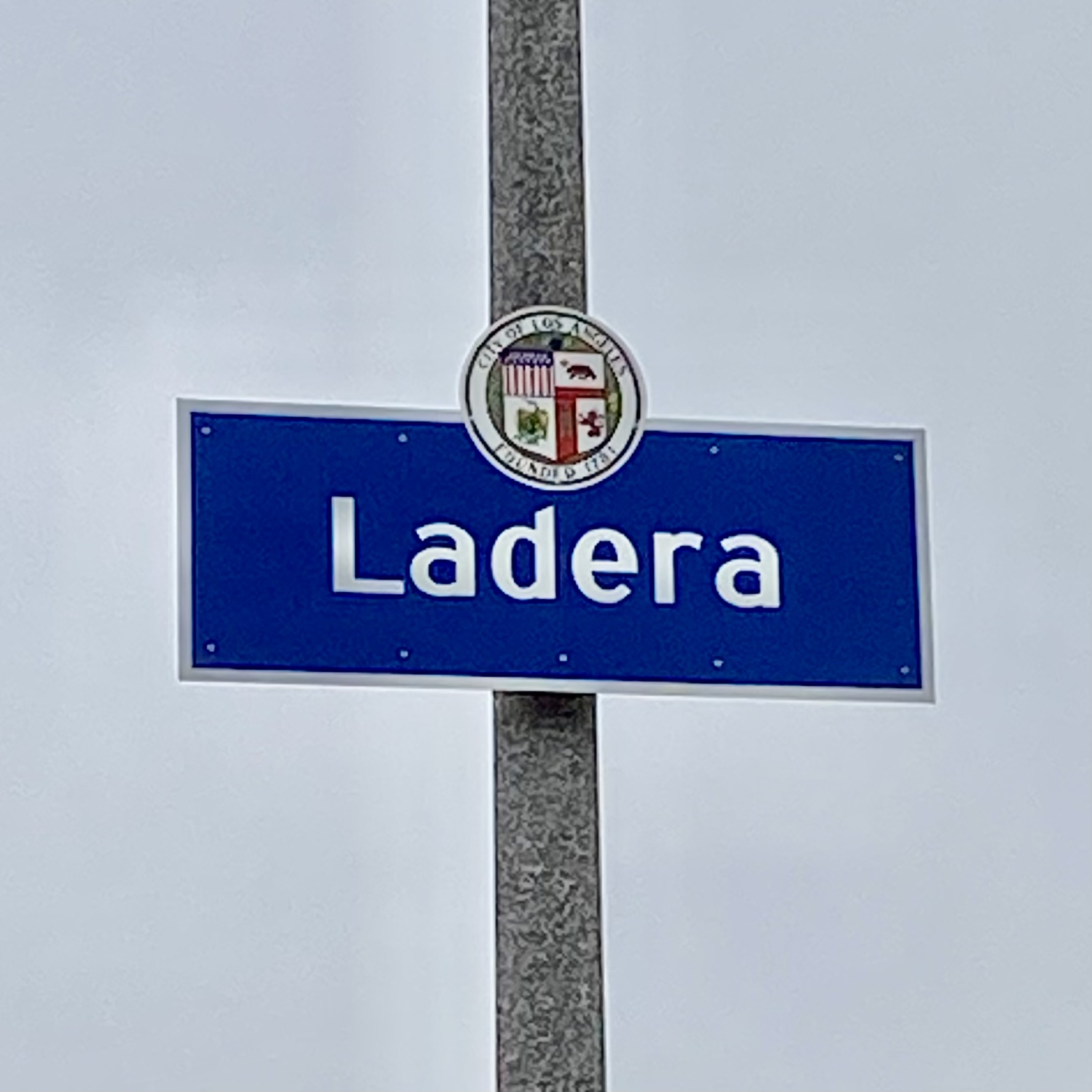
Ladera neighborhood sign

Ladera is a neighborhood in Los Angeles, California, lying between Inglewood and an unincorporated area of Los Angeles County.

== History ==
The first homes built in the Ladera Heights home development in 1946 were built in the City of Los Angeles section on Condon Avenue ... As the home development spread to the west of La Cienega in the 1950s and 1960s, the original area became known as "Old Ladera."

In 2011 the Los Angeles City section was made a part of the 11th Councilmanic District, and residents petitioned later that this neighborhood be officially recognized under the name of Ladera. The naming as a Los Angeles neighborhood was done by the Los Angeles City Council on February 24, 2017, and neighborhood signs were placed by the city beginning in July of that year.
