= Cognitive miser =

Psychological problem-solving tendency

In psychology, the human mind is considered to be a cognitive miser due to the tendency of humans to think and solve problems in simpler and less effortful ways rather than in more sophisticated and effortful ways, regardless of intelligence. Just as a miser seeks to avoid spending money, the human mind often seeks to avoid spending cognitive effort. The cognitive miser theory is an umbrella theory of cognition that brings together previous research on heuristics and attributional biases to explain when and why people are cognitive misers.

Psychologists Susan Fiske and Shelley Taylor introduced the term in 1984, writing that "People are limited in their capacity to process information, so they take shortcuts whenever they can." It is an important concept in social cognition theory and has been influential in other social sciences such as economics and political science.

== Assumption ==
The metaphor of the cognitive miser assumes that the human mind is limited in time, knowledge, attention, and cognitive resources. Usually people do not think rationally or cautiously, but use cognitive shortcuts to make inferences and form judgments. These shortcuts include the use of schemas, scripts, stereotypes, and other simplified perceptual strategies instead of careful thinking. For example, people tend to make correspondent reasoning and are likely to believe that behaviors should be correlated to or representative of stable characteristics.

== Background ==
=== The naïve scientist and attribution theory ===
Before Fiske and Taylor's cognitive miser theory, the predominant model of social cognition was the naïve scientist. First proposed in 1958 by Fritz Heider in The Psychology of Interpersonal Relations, this theory holds that humans think and act with dispassionate rationality whilst engaging in detailed and nuanced thought processes for both complex and routine actions. In this way, humans were thought to think like scientists, albeit naïve ones, measuring and analyzing the world around them. Applying this framework to human thought processes, naïve scientists seek the consistency and stability that comes from a coherent view of the world and need for environmental control.

In order to meet these needs, naïve scientists make attributions. Thus, attribution theory emerged from the study of the ways in which individuals assess causal relationships and mechanisms. Through the study of causal attributions, led by Harold Kelley and Bernard Weiner amongst others, social psychologists began to observe that subjects regularly demonstrate several attributional biases including but not limited to the fundamental attribution error.

The study of attributions had two effects: it created further interest in testing the naive scientist and opened up a new wave of social psychology research that questioned its explanatory power. This second effect helped to lay the foundation for Fiske and Taylor's cognitive miser.

=== Stereotypes ===
According to Walter Lippmann's arguments in his classic book Public Opinion, people are not equipped to deal with complexity. Attempting to observe things freshly and in detail is mentally exhausting, especially among busy affairs. The term stereotype is thus introduced: people have to reconstruct the complex situation on a simpler model before they can cope with it, and the simpler model can be regarded as a stereotype. Stereotypes are formed from outside sources which identified with people's interests and can be reinforced since people could be impressed by those facts that fit their philosophy.

On the other hand, in Lippmann's view, people are told about the world before they see it. People's behavior is not based on direct and certain knowledge, but pictures made or given to them. Hence, influence from external factors are unneglectable in shaping people's stereotypes. "The subtlest and most pervasive of all influences are those which create and maintain the repertory of stereotypes." That is to say, people live in a second-handed world with mediated reality, where the simplified model for thinking (i.e., stereotypes) could be created and maintained by external forces. Lippmann suggested that the public "cannot be wise", since they can be easily misled by overly simplified reality which is consistent with their pre-existing pictures in mind, and any disturbance of the existing stereotypes will seem like "an attack upon the foundation of the universe".

Although Lippmann did not directly define the term cognitive miser, stereotypes have important functions in simplifying people's thinking process. As cognitive simplification, it is useful for realistic economic management, otherwise people will be overwhelmed by the complexity of the real rationales. Stereotype, as a phenomenon, has become a standard topic in sociology and social psychology.

=== Heuristics ===
Much of the cognitive miser theory is built upon work done on heuristics in judgment and decision-making, most notably Amos Tversky and Daniel Kahneman results published in a series of influential articles. Heuristics can be defined as the "judgmental shortcuts that generally get us where we need to go—and quickly—but at the cost of occasionally sending us off course." In their work, Kahneman and Tversky demonstrated that people rely upon different types of heuristics or mental short cuts in order to save time and mental energy. However, in relying upon heuristics instead of detailed analysis, like the information processing employed by Heider's naïve scientist, biased information processing is more likely to occur. Some of these heuristics include:

- representativeness heuristic (the inclination to assign specific attributes to an individual the more he/she matches the prototype of that group).
- availability heuristic (the inclination to judge the likelihood of something occurring because of the ease of thinking of examples of that event occurring)
- anchoring and adjustment heuristic (the inclination to overweight the importance and influence of an initial piece of information, and then adjusting one's answer away from this anchor).

The frequency with which Kahneman and Tversky and other attribution researchers found the individuals employed mental shortcuts to make decisions and assessments laid important groundwork for the overarching idea that individuals and their minds act efficiently instead of analytically.

== Cognitive miser theory ==
The wave of research on attributional biases done by Kahneman, Tversky and others effectively ended the dominance of Heider's naïve scientist within social psychology. Fiske and Taylor, building upon the prevalence of heuristics in human cognition, offered their theory of the cognitive miser. It is, in many ways, a unifying theory of ad-hoc decision-making which suggests that humans engage in economically prudent thought processes instead of acting like scientists who rationally weigh cost and benefit data, test hypotheses, and update expectations based upon the results of the discrete experiments that are our everyday actions. In other words, humans are more inclined to act as cognitive misers using mental short cuts to make assessments and decisions regarding issues and ideas about which they know very little, including issues of great salience. Fiske and Taylor argue that it is rational to act as a cognitive miser due to the sheer volume and intensity of information and stimuli humans intake. Given the limited information processing capabilities of individuals, people try to adopt strategies that economise complex problems. Cognitive misers usually act in two ways: by disregarding part of the information to reduce their own cognitive load, or by overusing some kind of information to avoid the burden of finding and processing more information.

Other psychologists also argue that the cognitively miserly tendency of humans is a primary reason why "humans are often less than rational". The basic principle is to save mental energy as much as possible, even when it is required to "use your head". Unless the cognitive environment meets certain criteria, we will, by default, try to avoid thinking as much as possible.

== Implications ==
The implications of this theory raise important questions about both cognition and human behavior. In addition to streamlining cognition in complicated, analytical tasks, the cognitive miser approach is also used when dealing with unfamiliar issues and issues of great importance.

=== Politics ===
Voting behavior in democracies are an arena in which the cognitive miser is at work. Acting as a cognitive miser should lead those with expertise in an area to more efficient information processing and streamlined decision making. However, as Lau and Redlawsk note, acting as cognitive miser who employs heuristics can have very different results for high-information and low-information voters. They write, "...cognitive heuristics are at times employed by almost all voters, and that they are particularly likely to be used when the choice situation facing voters is complex... heuristic use generally increases the probability of a correct vote by political experts but decreases the probability of a correct vote by novices." In democracies, where no vote is weighted more or less because of the expertise behind its casting, low-information voters, acting as cognitive misers, can have broad and potentially deleterious choices for a society.

Samuel Popkin argues that voters make rational choices by using information shortcuts that they receive during campaigns, usually using something akin to a drunkard's search. Voters use small amounts of personal information to construct a narrative about candidates. Essentially, they ask themselves this: "Based on what I know about the candidate personally, what is the probability that this presidential candidate was a good governor? What is the probability that he will be a good president?" Popkin's analysis is based on one main premise: voters use low information rationality gained in their daily lives, through the media and through personal interactions, to evaluate candidates and facilitate electoral choices.

=== Economics ===
Cognitive misers could also be one of the contributors to the prisoner's dilemma in game theory. To save cognitive energy, cognitive misers tend to assume that other people are similar to themselves. That is, habitual cooperators assume most of the others as cooperators, and habitual defectors assume most of the others as defectors. Experimental research has shown that since cooperators offer to play more often, and fellow cooperators will also more often accept their offer, cooperators would have a higher expected payoff compared with defectors when certain boundary conditions are met.

=== Mass communication ===
Lack of public support towards emerging techniques are commonly attributed to lack of relevant information and the low scientific literacy among the public. Known as the knowledge deficit model, this point of view is based on idealistic assumptions that education for science literacy could increase public support of science, and the focus of science communication should be increasing scientific understanding among lay public. However, the relationship between information and attitudes towards scientific issues are not empirically supported.

Based on the assumption that human beings are cognitive misers and tend to minimize the cognitive costs, low-information rationality was introduced as an empirically grounded alternative in explaining decision making and attitude formation. Rather than using an in-depth understanding of scientific topics, people make decisions based on other shortcuts or heuristics such as ideological predistortions or cues from mass media due to the subconscious compulsion to use only as much information as necessary. The less expertise citizens have on an issue initially, the more likely they will rely on these shortcuts. Further, people spend less cognitive effort in buying toothpaste than they do when picking a new car, and that difference in information-seeking is largely a function of the costs.

The cognitive miser theory thus has implications for persuading the public: attitude formation is a competition between people's value systems and prepositions (or their own interpretive schemata) on a certain issue, and how public discourses frame it. Framing theory suggest that the same topic will result in different interpretations among audience, if the information is presented in different ways. Audiences' attitude change is closely connected with relabeling or re-framing the certain issue. In this sense, effective communication can be achieved if media provide audiences with cognitive shortcuts or heuristics that are resonate with underlying audience schemata.

=== Risk assessment ===
The metaphor of cognitive misers could assist people in drawing lessons from risks, which is the possibility that an undesirable state of reality may occur. People apply a number of shortcuts or heuristics in making judgements about the likelihood of an event, because the rapid answers provided by heuristics are often right. Yet certain pitfalls may be neglected in these shortcuts. A practical example of the cognitively miserly way of thinking in the context of a risk assessment of Deepwater Horizon explosion, is presented below.

- People have trouble in imagining how small failings can pile up to form a catastrophe;
- People tend to get accustomed to risk. Due to the seemingly smooth current situation, people unconsciously adjust their acceptance of risk;
- People tend to over-express their faith and confidence in backup systems and safety devices;
- People regard complicated technical systems in line with complicated governing structures;
- When concerned with a certain issue, people tend to spread good news and hide bad news;
- People tend to think alike if they are in the same field (see also: echo chamber), regardless of their position in a project's hierarchy.

=== Psychology ===
The theory that human beings are cognitive misers, also shed light on the dual process theory in psychology. Dual process theory proposes that there are two types of cognitive processes in human mind. Daniel Kahneman described these as intuitive (System 1) and reasoning (System 2), respectively.

When processing with System 1, which starts automatically and without control, people expend little to no effort, but can generate complex patterns of ideas. When processing with System 2, people actively consider how best to distribute mental effort to accurately process data, and can construct thoughts in an orderly series of steps. These two cognitive processing systems are not separate and can have interactions with each other. Here is an example of how people's beliefs are formed under the dual process model:

1. System 1 generates suggestions for System 2, with impressions, intuitions, intentions or feelings;
2. If System 1's proposal is endorsed by System 2, those impressions and intuitions will turn into beliefs, and the sudden inspiration generated by System 1 will turn into voluntary actions;
3. When everything goes smoothly (as is often the case), System 2 adopts the suggestions of System 1 with little or no modification. Herein there is a window for bias to form, as System 2 may be trained to incorrectly regard the accuracy of data derived from observations gathered via System 1.

The reasoning process can be activated to help with the intuition when:

- A question arises, but System 1 does not generate an answer
- An event is detected to violate the model of world that System 1 maintains.

Conflicts also exists in this dual-process. A brief example provided by Kahneman is that when we try not to stare at the oddly dressed couple at the neighboring table in a restaurant, our automatic reaction (System 1) makes us stare at them, but conflicts emerge as System 2 tries to control this behavior.

The dual processing system can produce cognitive illusions. System 1 always operates automatically, with our easiest shortcut but often with error. System 2 may also have no clue to the error. Errors can be prevented only by enhanced monitoring of System 2, which costs a plethora of cognitive efforts.

== Limitations ==
=== Omission of motivation ===
The cognitive miser theory did not originally specify the role of motivation. In Fiske's subsequent research, the omission of the role of intent in the metaphor of cognitive miser is recognized. Motivation does affect the activation and use of stereotypes and prejudices.

== Updates and later research ==
=== Motivated tactician ===
People tend to use heuristic shortcuts when making decisions. But the problem remains that, although these shortcuts could not compare to effortful thoughts in accuracy, people should have a certain parameter to help them adopt one of the most adequate shortcuts. Kruglanski proposed that people are combination of naïve scientists and cognitive misers: people are flexible social thinkers who choose between multiple cognitive strategies (i.e., speed/ease vs. accuracy/logic) based on their current goals, motives, and needs.

Later models suggest that the cognitive miser and the naïve scientist create two poles of social cognition that are too monolithic. Instead, Fiske, Taylor, and Arie W. Kruglanski and other social psychologists offer an alternative explanation of social cognition: the motivated tactician. According to this theory, people employ either shortcuts or thoughtful analysis based upon the context and salience of a particular issue. In other words, this theory suggests that humans are, in fact, both naive scientists and cognitive misers. In this sense people are strategic instead of passively choosing the most effortless shortcuts when they allocate their cognitive efforts, and therefore they can decide to be naïve scientists or cognitive misers depending on their goals.

== See also ==
- Bounded rationality
- Low-information voter
- Motivated reasoning
- Representativeness heuristic
- Path of least resistance
