= Hot and cold cognition =

Cognitive processing, either influenced or not

Hot cognition is a hypothesis on motivated reasoning in which a person's thinking is influenced by their emotional state. Put simply, hot cognition is cognition coloured by emotion. Hot cognition contrasts with cold cognition, which implies cognitive processing of information that is independent of emotional involvement. Hot cognition is proposed to be associated with cognitive and physiological arousal, in which a person is more responsive to environmental factors. As it is automatic, rapid and led by emotion, hot cognition may consequently cause biased decision making. Hot cognition may arise, with varying degrees of strength, in politics, religion, and other sociopolitical contexts because of moral issues, which are inevitably tied to emotion. Hot cognition was initially proposed in 1963 by Robert P. Abelson. The idea became popular in the 1960s and the 1970s.

An example of a biased decision caused by hot cognition would be a juror disregarding evidence because of an attraction to the defendant. Decision making with cold cognition is more likely to involve logic and critical analysis. Therefore, when an individual engages in a task while using cold cognition, the stimulus is likely to be emotionally neutral and the "outcome of the test is not motivationally relevant" to the individual. An example of a critical decision using cold cognition would be concentrating on the evidence before drawing a conclusion.

Hot and cold cognition form a dichotomy within executive functioning. Executive functioning has long been considered as a domain general cognitive function, but there has been support for separation into "hot" affective aspects and "cold" cognitive aspects. It is recognized that executive functioning spans across a number of cognitive tasks, including working memory, cognitive flexibility and reasoning in active goal pursuit. The distinction between hot and cool cognition implies that executive function may operate differently in different contexts. The distinction has been applied to research in cognitive psychology, developmental psychology, clinical psychology, social psychology, neuropsychology, and other areas of study in psychology.

== Development and neuroanatomy ==
Performance on hot and cold tasks improves most rapidly during the preschool years, but continues into adolescence. This co-occurs with both structural and functional development associated with the prefrontal cortex. Specific areas within the prefrontal cortex (PFC) are thought to be associated with both hot and cold cognition. Hot cognition is likely to be utilized during tasks that require the regulation of emotion or motivation, as well as the re-evaluation of the motivational significance of a stimulus. The ventral and medial areas of the prefrontal cortex (VM-PFC) are implicated during these tasks. Cold cognition is thought to be associated with executive functions elicited by abstract, deconceptualized tasks, such as card sorting. The area of the brain that is utilized for these tasks is the dorsolateral prefrontal cortex (DL-PFC). It is between the ages of 3 years and 5 years that the most significant change in task completion is seen. Age-related trends have been observed in tasks used to measure hot cognition, as well as cold cognition. However, the age at which children reach adult-like functioning varies.

It appears as though children take longer to fully develop hot executive functioning than cold. This lends support to the idea that hot cognition may follow a separate, and perhaps delayed, developmental trajectory as opposed to cold cognition. Further research done on these neurological areas suggests there may be some plasticity during the development of both hot and cold cognition. While the preschool years are ones of extreme sensitivity to the development of prefrontal cortex, a similar period is found in the transition into adolescence. This gives rise to the idea that there may be a time window for intervention training, which would improve cognitive abilities and executive functioning in children and adolescents.

== Marketing ==
In marketing research, an audience's energy takes the form of psychological heat: hot cognition is an emotional thought process and cold cognition is a cognitive thought process.

== Assessment ==
This section explains the most common tasks that are used to measure hot and cold cognitive functioning. The cool tasks are neutrally affective and measure executive function abilities such as cognitive flexibility and working memory. In other words, there is nothing to be gained or lost by performing these tasks. The hot tasks also measure executive function, but these tasks result in emotionally significant consequences.

=== Hot function tasks ===
==== Iowa gambling task ====
In the Iowa gambling task participants are initially given $2,000 facsimile dollars and asked to win as much money as possible. They are presented with four decks of cards that represent either a gain or loss in money. One card from each deck is drawn at a time. Consistently choosing a card from the advantageous decks results in a net gain, whereas choosing from a disadvantageous deck results in a net loss. Each card from the disadvantageous deck offers a higher reward than the advantageous deck, but also a higher and more variable loss.

==== Delay of gratification ====
Studies have been conducted on the concept of delay of gratification to test whether or not people are capable of waiting to receive a reward in order to increase the value of the reward. In these experiments, participants can choose to either take the reward they are immediately presented with or can choose to wait a period of time to then receive a higher valued reward. Hot cognition would motivate people to immediately satisfy their craving for the present reward rather than waiting for a better reward.

==== Neutral versus negative syllogisms tasks ====
The influence that beliefs can have on logical reasoning may vary as a result of emotions during cognitive processes. When presented with neutral content, this will typically lead to the exhibition of the belief-bias effect. In contrast, content that is emotionally charged will result in a diminished likelihood of beliefs having an influence. The impact of negative emotions demonstrates the capability they have for altering the process underlying logical reasoning. There is an interaction that occurs between emotions and beliefs that interferes with the ability that an individual has to reason.

=== Cold function tasks ===
The cool tasks are neutrally affective and measure executive function abilities such as cognitive flexibility and working memory. In other words, there is nothing to be gained or lost by performing these tasks. The hot tasks also measure executive function, but these tasks result in emotionally significant consequences.

==== Self Ordered Pointing ====
In this task an array of items is presented to participants. The position of these items then randomly changes from trial to trial. Participants are instructed to point to one of these items, but then asked to not point to that same item again. In order to perform well on this task, participants must remember what item they pointed to and use this information to decide on subsequent responses.

==== Wisconsin Card Sort Task (WCST) ====
The Wisconsin Card Sort Task requires participants to sort stimulus cards that differ in dimensions (shape, colour, or number). However, they are not told how to sort them. The only feedback they receive is whether or not a match is correct. Participants must discover the rule according to dimension. Once the participant matches a certain number of correct cards, the dimension changes and they must rediscover the new rule. This requires participants to remember the rule they were using and cognitively change the rule by which they use to sort.

==== Dimensional Change Card Sort Task (DCCS) ====
Participants are required to sort stimulus cards based on either shape or colour. They are first instructed to sort based on one dimension (colour) in a trial, and then it switches to the other (shape) in the following trial. "Switch" trials are also used where the participant must change back and forth between rules within a single trial. Unlike the WCST, the rule is explicitly stated and does not have to be inferred. The task measures how flexible participants are to changing rules. This requires participants to shift between dimensions of sorting.

== Recent evidence ==
Research has demonstrated emotional manipulations on decision making processes. Participants who are induced with enthusiasm, anger or distress (different specific emotions) responded in different ways to the risky-choice problems, demonstrating that hot cognition, as an automatic process, affects decision making differently. Another example of hot cognition is a better predictor of negative emotional arousal as compared to cold cognition when they have a personal investment, such as wanting your team to win. In addition, hot cognition changes the way people use decision-making strategies, depending on the type of mood they are in, positive or negative. When people are in a positive mood, they tend to use compensatory, holistic strategies. This leads to a shallow and broad processing of information. In a negative mood people employ non-compensatory, narrow strategies which leads to a more detail-oriented and thorough processing of information. In the study participants were shown movie clips in order to induce a mood of happiness, anger or sadness and asked to complete a decision-making task. Researchers found that participants in the negative mood condition used more non-compensatory, specific decision-making techniques by focusing on the details of the situation. Participants in the positive mood condition used more compensatory, broad decision making techniques by focusing on the bigger picture of the situation. Also, hot cognition has been implicated in automatic processing and autobiographical memory. Furthermore, hot cognition extends outside the laboratory as exhibited in political process and criminal judgments. When police officers were induced with sadness they were more likely to think the suspect was guilty. However, if police officers were induced with anger there was no difference in judgments. There are also clinical implications for understanding certain disorders. Patients diagnosed with anorexia nervosa went through intervention training, which included hot cognition as a part of emotional processing development, did not show any improvement after this training. In another clinical population, those diagnosed with bipolar disorder exaggerated their perception of negative feedback and were less likely to adjust their decision making process in the face of risky-choices (gambling tasks).

== See also ==
- Arousal
- Affective forecasting
- Hot-cold empathy gap
- Valence (psychology)
