= Henshey's =

Defunct department store

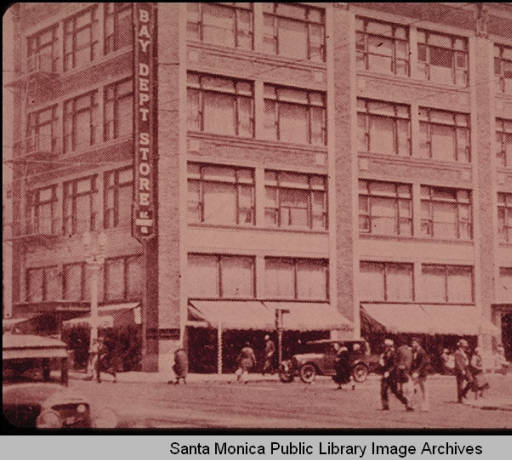
Bay Dept. Store, later Henshey's

Henshey's was a major department store in Downtown Santa Monica, California founded by Harry Henshey and partners, the first department store in Los Angeles' Westside. It opened in 1925 as the Bay Department Store, at four stories and 25,000 square feet (2,300 m^{2}), far larger than any store in the city. It later expanded to 65,000 square feet (6,000 m^{2}). It had the first escalators on the Westside but retained one elevator with a human operator until its closure. It was owned by Charles Tegner.

In 1966, it opened a branch in the Ladera Heights Shopping Center (where Ross is located in 2025) which closed in 1990.

In 1992, the store closed, blaming poor sales from the Early 1990s recession, from not having changed its merchandise to attract younger clientele, and on competition from the larger J. W. Robinson's and Broadway stores in the nearby Santa Monica Place mall.

The building, 402 Santa Monica Blvd., was torn down in 1994 after suffering earthquake damage. An REI store occupies the site.

== Building ==
The original Henshey’s store was designed by Henry C. Hollwedel, who also designed the Santa Monica Bay Woman's Club, City Hall (demolished), Mayfair Theater, and the Churrigueresque building at 1443-1447 Fourth Street. The Bay/Henshey's building was a steel frame and brick structure in the Beaux Arts Classical Revival style featuring "bays of paired windows embellished with terra cotta details, as well as an imposing cornice and a terra cotta frieze".

After the 1994 Northridge earthquake damaged it beyond repair, the building was demolished that same year.
