= Computational-representational understanding of mind =

Hypothesis in cognitive science

Computational representational understanding of mind (CRUM) is a hypothesis in cognitive science which proposes that thinking is performed by computations operating on representations. This hypothesis assumes that the mind has mental representations analogous to data structures and computational procedures analogous to algorithms, such that computer programs using algorithms applied to data structures can model the mind and its processes.

CRUM takes into consideration several theoretical approaches of understanding human cognition, including logic, rule, concept, analogy, image, and connectionist-based systems based on artificial neural networks. These serve as the representation aspects of CRUM theory which are then acted upon to simulate certain aspects of human cognition, such as the use of rule-based systems in neuroeconomics.

There is much disagreement on this hypothesis, but CRUM has high regard among some researchers. Philosopher Paul Thagard called it "the most theoretically and experimentally successful approach to mind ever developed".

== See also ==
- Cognitive science
- Computational neuroscience
