= Expressive responding =

Expression of opinions in a survey that do not fit actual beliefs

Expressive responding is the expression of opinions in a survey that opposes or exaggerates actual beliefs in such a way as to provide psychological comfort for the responder. Expressive responding can be found in groups across the political spectrum.

There is evidence that expressive responding is done more for internal psychological gain than as a response to true belief in misinformation.

Expressive responding is more common in those who respond to questions about rumours.

== See also ==
- Motivated reasoning
