= Emotional reasoning =

Cognitive process

Emotional reasoning is a cognitive process by which an individual concludes that their emotional reaction proves something is true, despite contrary empirical evidence. Emotional reasoning creates an 'emotional truth', which may be in direct conflict with the inverse 'perceptional truth'. It can create feelings of anxiety, fear, and apprehension in existing stressful situations, and as such, is often associated with or triggered by panic disorder or anxiety disorder. For example, even though a spouse has shown only devotion, a person using emotional reasoning might conclude, "I know my spouse is being unfaithful because I feel jealous."

This process amplifies the effects of other cognitive distortions. For example, a student may feel insecure about their understanding of test material even though they are capable of answering the questions. If said student acts on their insecurity about failing the test, they might make the assumption that they misunderstand the material and therefore may guess answers randomly, causing their own failure in a self-fulfilling prophecy.

Emotional reasoning is related to other similar concepts, such as: motivated reasoning, a type of reasoning wherein individuals reach conclusions from bias instead of empirical motivations; emotional intelligence, which relates to the ways in which individuals use their emotions to understand situations or the information and reach conclusions; and cognitive distortion or cognitive deficiency, wherein individuals misinterpret situations or make decisions without considering a range of consequences.

== Origin ==
Emotional reasoning, as a concept, was first introduced by psychiatrist Aaron Beck. It was included as a part of Beck's broader research topic: cognitive distortions and depression. To counteract cognitive distortions, Beck developed a type of therapy formally known as cognitive therapy, which became associated with cognitive-behavioral therapy.

Emotional reasoning had been attributed to automatic thinking, but Beck believed that it stemmed from negative thoughts that were uncontrollable and happened without effort. This reasoning has been commonly accepted over the years. Most recently, a new explanation states that an "activating agent" or sensory trigger from the environment increases emotional arousal. With this increase in arousal, certain areas of the brain are inhibited. The combination of an increase in emotional arousal and the inhibition of parts of the brain leads to emotional reasoning.

== Examples ==
The following are simple examples of emotional reasoning.

Emotional reasoning examples
| Emotion | Facts | False conclusion |
|---|---|---|
| I feel jealous | My spouse is apparently faithful and loving | My spouse is unfaithful, because I wouldn't feel jealous if my spouse were faithful and loving |
| I feel lonely | My friends and family seem to like me and normally treat me well | I am unlovable, because I wouldn't feel lonely if I were lovable |
| I feel guilty | Neither I nor anyone around me is aware of any wrong I've done | I did something wrong, because I wouldn't feel guilty unless I had done something wrong |
| I feel angry at her | I can't think of anything upsetting she did or any harm she caused me | She did something wrong, because I wouldn't feel angry at her unless she had done something wrong |
| I feel stupid | My academic and professional success is typical or better | I am stupid, because I wouldn't feel stupid or doubt my proven abilities unless I really was stupid |
| I feel anxious | I am in a relatively safe place | Assuming that the more intense the anxiety, the greater the actual threat |

== Treatment ==
Before seeking professional help, an individual can influence the effect that emotional reasoning has on them based on his or her coping method. Using a proactive, problem-focused coping style is more effective at reducing stress and deterring stressful events. Additionally, having good social support also leads to lower psychological stress. If an individual chooses to seek professional help, a psychologist will often use cognitive-behavioural therapy to teach the patient how to challenge their cognitive distortions, including emotional reasoning. In this approach, the automatic thoughts that control emotional reasoning are identified, studied, and reasoned through by the patient. In doing so, the psychologist hopes to change the automatic thoughts of the patient and reduce the patient's stress levels. Cognitive behavioural therapy has been generally regarded as the most-effective method of treatment for emotional reasoning.

Most recently, a new therapeutic approach uses the RIGAAR method to reduce emotional stress. RIGAAR is an abbreviation for: rapport building, information gathering, goal setting, accessing resources, agreeing strategies and rehearsing success.

Reducing emotional arousal is also suggested by the human givens approach in order to counter emotional reasoning. High emotional arousal inhibits brain regions necessary for logical complex reasoning. With less emotional arousal, cognitive reasoning is less affected and it is easier for the subject to disassociate reality from emotions.

== Factors ==
Cognitive schemas is one of the factors to cause emotional reasoning. Schema is made of how we look at this world and our real-life experiences. Schema helps us remember the important things or events that happened in our lives. The result of the learning process is the schema, and it is also made by classical and operant conditioning. For example, an individual can develop a schema about terrorists and spiders that are very dangerous. Based on their schema, people can change what they think or how they are biased about the way they perceive things. Information-processing biases of schema impact how a person thinks and remembers, and their understanding of experiences and information. The bias makes a person's schema automatically access similar content of schema. For example, a person with rat phobia is more likely to visualize or perceive a rat being near them. Schemas also easily connect with schema-central stimuli. For example, when depressed people start to think about negative things, it can be very difficult for them to think of anything positive.

For memory bias, schema can affect an individual's recollections to cause schema-incongruent memories. For example, if individuals have a schema about how intelligent they are, failure-related recollections have a high chance to be retained in their minds and they become likely to recall positive past events. The schema also make individuals biased through the way that they interpret information. In other words, schema alters their understanding of the information. For example, when people refuse to help low self-esteem children solve a math problem, the children may think they are too stupid to learn how to solve the problem rather than the other people being too busy to help.

== Reduction techniques ==
Techniques for reducing emotional reasoning include:

- Validity testing: Patients defend their thoughts and ideas using objective evidence to support their assumptions. If they cannot, they might be exposed to emotional reasoning.
- Cognitive reversal: Patients are told of a difficult situation that they had in the past, and work with a therapist to help them address and correct their problems. This can prepare the patient for similar situations so that they do not revert to emotional reasoning.
- Guided discovery: The therapist asks the patients a series of questions designed to help them realize their cognition distortions.
- Writing in a journal: Patients form a habit of writing in a journal to record the situations they face, emotions and thoughts they experience, and their responses or behaviors to them. The therapist and patient then analyze how the patient's maladaptive thought patterns influence their behaviors.
- Homework: Once the patient acquires the ability to perform self-recovery and remember the insights gained from therapy sessions, the patient is tasked with reviewing sessions and reading related books to focus their thoughts and behaviors, which are recorded and reviewed for the next therapy session.
- Modeling: The therapist could use role-playing to act in different ways in response to imagined situations so that patients could understand and model their behavior.
- Systematic positive reinforcement: The behavior-oriented therapist would use a reward system (systematic positive reinforcement) to motivate patients to reinforce specific behaviors.

Negative memories and stressful life circumstances have a chance to trigger depression. The main factor for causing depression is unresolved life experiences. People who experience emotional reasoning are more likely to connect to depression. Emotion-focused therapy (EFT) is a form of psychotherapy which can help people find a positive perspective of their emotional process. EFT is a research-based treatment that emphasizes emotional change, which is the goal of this therapy. EFT has two different alternative therapies for treatments: cognitive-behavioral therapy (CBT), which emphasizes changing self-defeating thoughts and behaviors; and interpersonal therapy (IPT), which emphasizes changing people's skills to have better interaction with others.

EFT operates on the understanding that a person's development is influenced by emotional memories and experiences. The purpose of the therapy is to change the emotional process by resurfacing painful emotional experiences and bringing them into awareness. This process helps patients to differentiate between what they experience and the influence of past experiences on how they feel. This can result in greater self-awareness of what they want in their life and enable better decision-making through reducing emotional reasoning. Another purpose of EFT is to promote emotional intelligence, which is the ability to understand their emotions and perceive emotional information, controlling their behavior while responding to problems.

Emotion-focused coping is a way to focus on managing one's emotions to reduce stress and also to reduce the chance to have emotional reasoning. Cognitive therapy is a form of therapy that helps patients recognize their negative thought patterns about themselves and events to revise these thought patterns and change their behavior. Cognitive-behavioral therapy helps individuals to perform well at cognitive tasks and to help them rethink their situation in a way that can benefit them. The treatment of cognitive-behavioral therapy is through the process of learning and making the change for maladaptive emotions, thoughts, and behaviors.

== Implications ==
If not treated, debilitating effects can occur, the most common being depression. However, emotional reasoning has the potential to be useful when appraising the outside world and not ourselves. How one feels when assessing an object, person or event, can be an instinctual survival response and a way to adapt to the world. "The amygdala buried deep in the limbic system serves as an early warning device for novelty, precisely so that attention can be mobilized to alert the mind to potential danger and to prepare for a potential of flight or fight."

== See also ==
- Cognitive bias
- Emotionally focused therapy § Emotion response types
- Intensity of preference
- Motivated forgetting
- Motivated reasoning
- Motivated sequence
- Motivated tactician
