= Culver City High School =

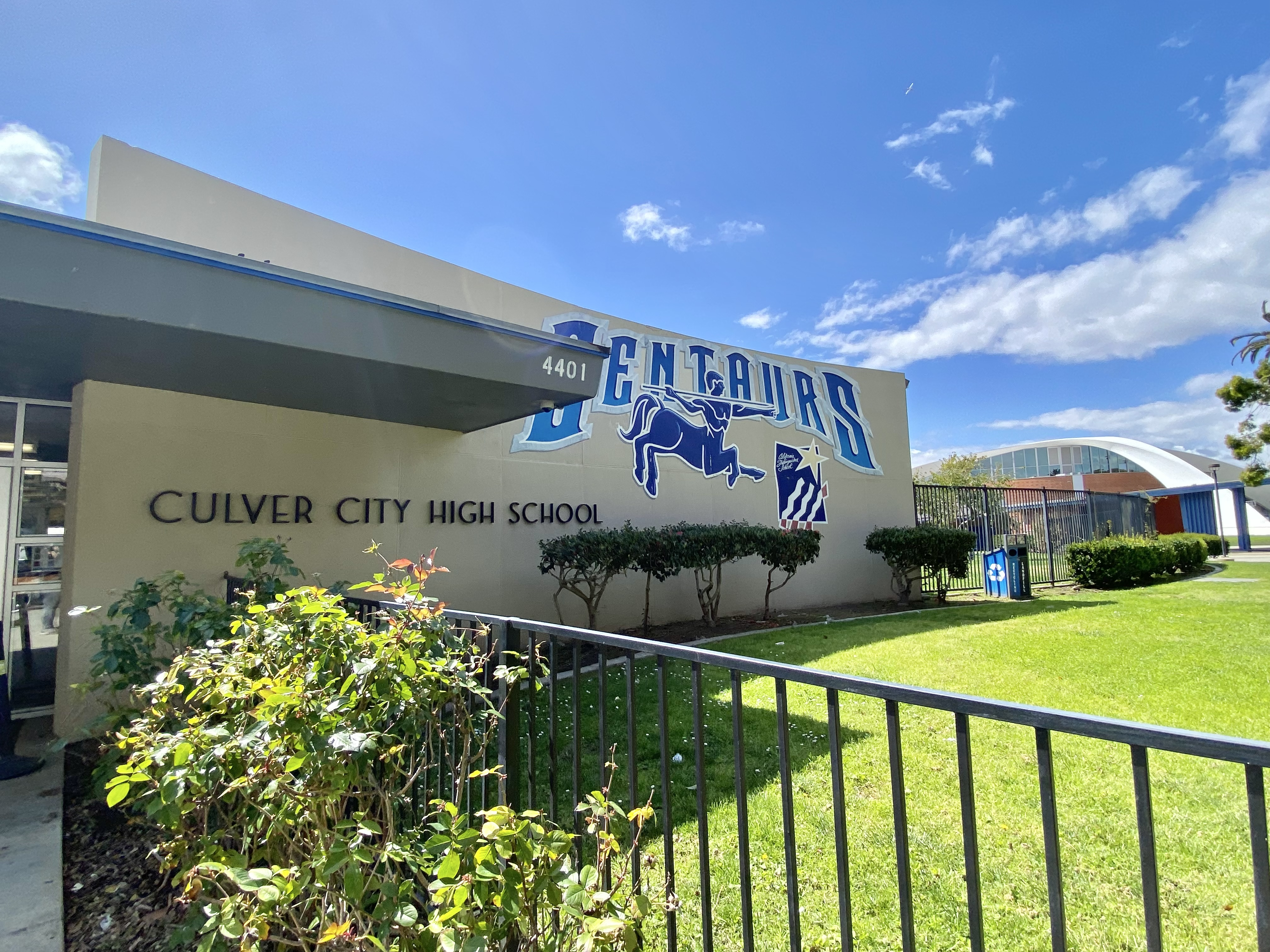
- Front entrance of Culver City High School

Location
- 4401 Elenda Street; Culver City, California 90230; United States; 34°00′27″N 118°24′07″W

Information
- Motto: "Learn To Achieve. Achieve To Learn. Tomorrow Starts Today."
- Established: January 1951
- School district: Culver City Unified School District
- Principal: Adrienne Thomas (as of 7/1/2023)
- Teaching staff: 94.22 (FTE)
- Enrollment: 2,085 (2023–2024)
- Student to teacher ratio: 22.13
- Colors: Blue, white, silver
- Mascot: Centaur
- Website: cchs.ccusd.org

Culver City High School is the main public high school of the Culver City Unified School District (CCUSD) in Culver City, California. It was established in 1951. The school's colors are blue and silver, and the mascot is the centaur. As of 2022, its enrollment was roughly 2,200. Culver City High School is recognized as a California Distinguished School, earning the honor in 2005. The Robert Frost Auditorium is located within the school grounds of Culver City High School.

The district, and therefore the high school's attendance boundary, includes Culver City and a portion of Los Angeles.

== Game Design program ==
Culver City High School is known for its game design curriculum that pioneered the high school level program. Founded in 2022, the class teaches production, design, coding, and numerous other development tools to educate students in digital creation. Originally created and taught by Kian Darien, his vision for the program was funded by the Epic Mega Grant from Epic Games, and was validated for California's Career Technical Education program following its first successful year in 2023. The program is certified as the model example for the Game Design category of the Arts, Entertainment, and Design (AED) framework established by the Creative Educators Network, a category it pioneered with its creation. Additionally, Darien manages the local e-sports team funded by the same grant, leading the team to the grand finals of the PLAYVS NASEF championships twice.

== Notable alumni ==
- Kurt Alexander - "Big Boy" radio host
- Kelvin Atkinson – Nevada State Senate Majority Leader
- Ben Brode – designer of Hearthstone and MARVEL SNAP
- Derrick Deese – San Francisco 49ers and Tampa Bay Buccaneers
- Zevi Eckhaus – college football quarterback for the Bryant Bulldogs and the Washington State Cougars
- Joe Faust – Olympic high jumper, aviation publisher, renewable energy publisher
- Rocky George – Suicidal Tendencies guitarist
- Darrin Jackson of the Chicago Cubs
- Carnell Lake of the Pittsburgh Steelers, Jacksonville Jaguars, and Baltimore Ravens
- Billy Parks of the San Diego Chargers, Dallas Cowboys, and Houston Oilers
- Karl Paymah of the Denver Broncos, Minnesota Vikings, and San Francisco 49ers
- Lauren Reynolds - investigative reporter, KGTV 10 News, San Diego
- Ryan Sherriff – Major League Baseball pitcher
- Mark Stevens - Venture capitalist and part owner of the Golden State Warriors
- Pepi Sonuga – actress
- Chris Strait - comedian
- Robert Trujillo – Metallica bassist
- Haji Wright - professional soccer player
