= Culver City Unified School District =

School district in California, United States

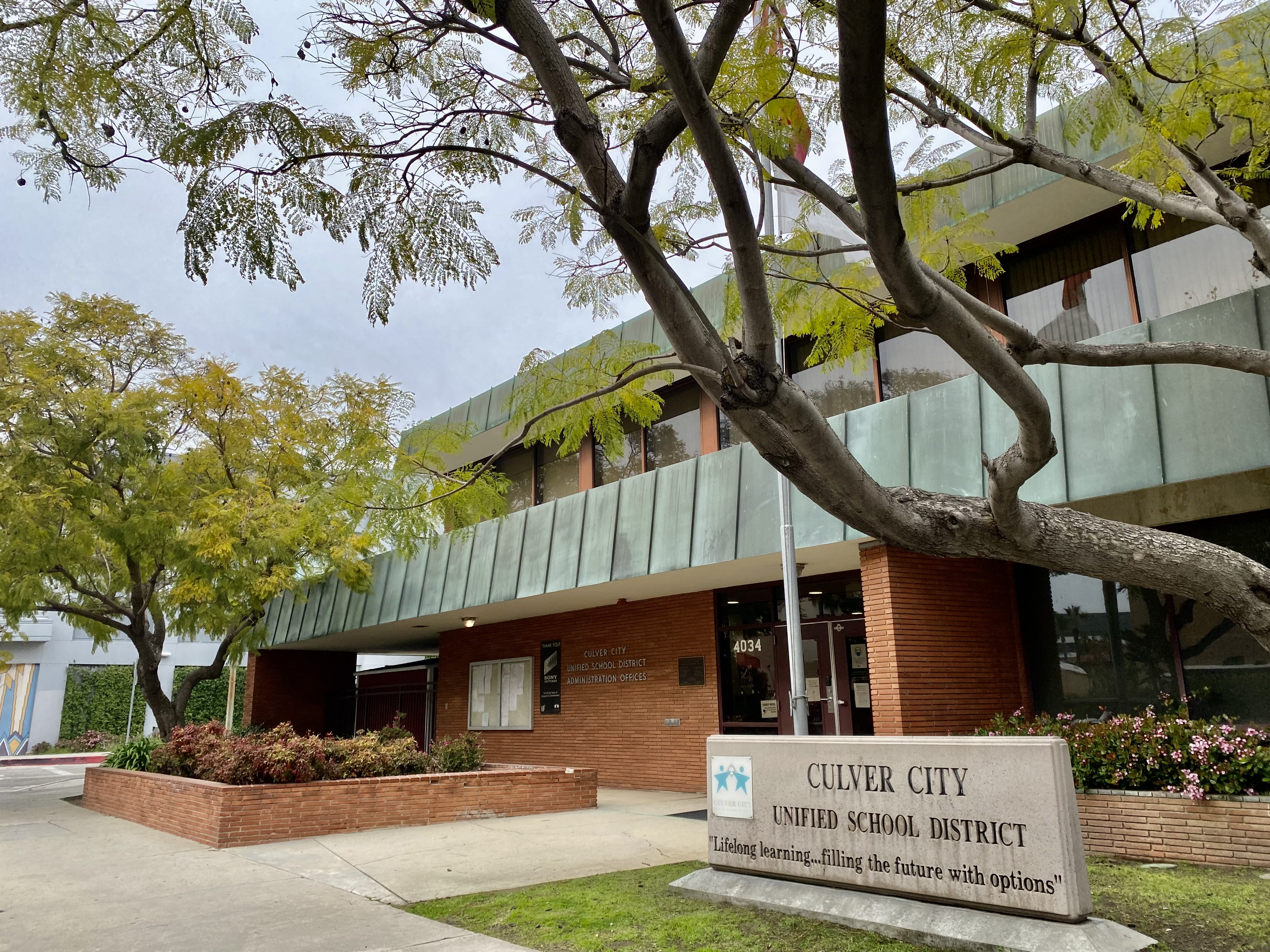
- CCUSD district administration building, 4034 Irving Place

Location
- Culver City, California California United States

District information
- Type: Public
- Grades: Pre K-12
- United Teachers Los Angeles, California Teachers Association

Culver City Unified School District, abbreviated CCUSD, is a school district located in Culver City, California. It serves approximately 6,500 pupils in a variety of schools.

The Culver City Unified School District primarily consists of five K-5 elementary schools, one middle school, and one high school. It also includes a continuation high school, an independent study school, an adult school and a preschool program.

The current district superintendent is Dr. Alfonso Jimenez.

One elementary school, El Marino Language School, has both a Spanish and Japanese language immersion program. It is a blue-ribbon school in the US, with top students coming from it every year. Unlike the other four elementary schools in the district, El Marino does not have a neighborhood attendance area. Instead, admission is based on a lottery system in compliance with the California Education Code.

The district includes Culver City and a portion of Los Angeles, California.

== Schools ==
=== Online school ===
- iAcademy (K-12), 4601 Elenda St, CP annex #6

=== Preschool ===
- Office of Child Development (preschool), 10800 Farragut Drive

=== Elementary schools ===
- El Marino Language School (K-5), 11450 Port Rd.
- El Rincon School (K-5), 11177 Overland Ave.
- Farragut School (K-5), 10820 Farragut Dr.
- Howe (Linwood E.) Elementary School (K-5), 4100 Irving Pl.
- La Ballona School (K-5), 10915 Washington Blvd.
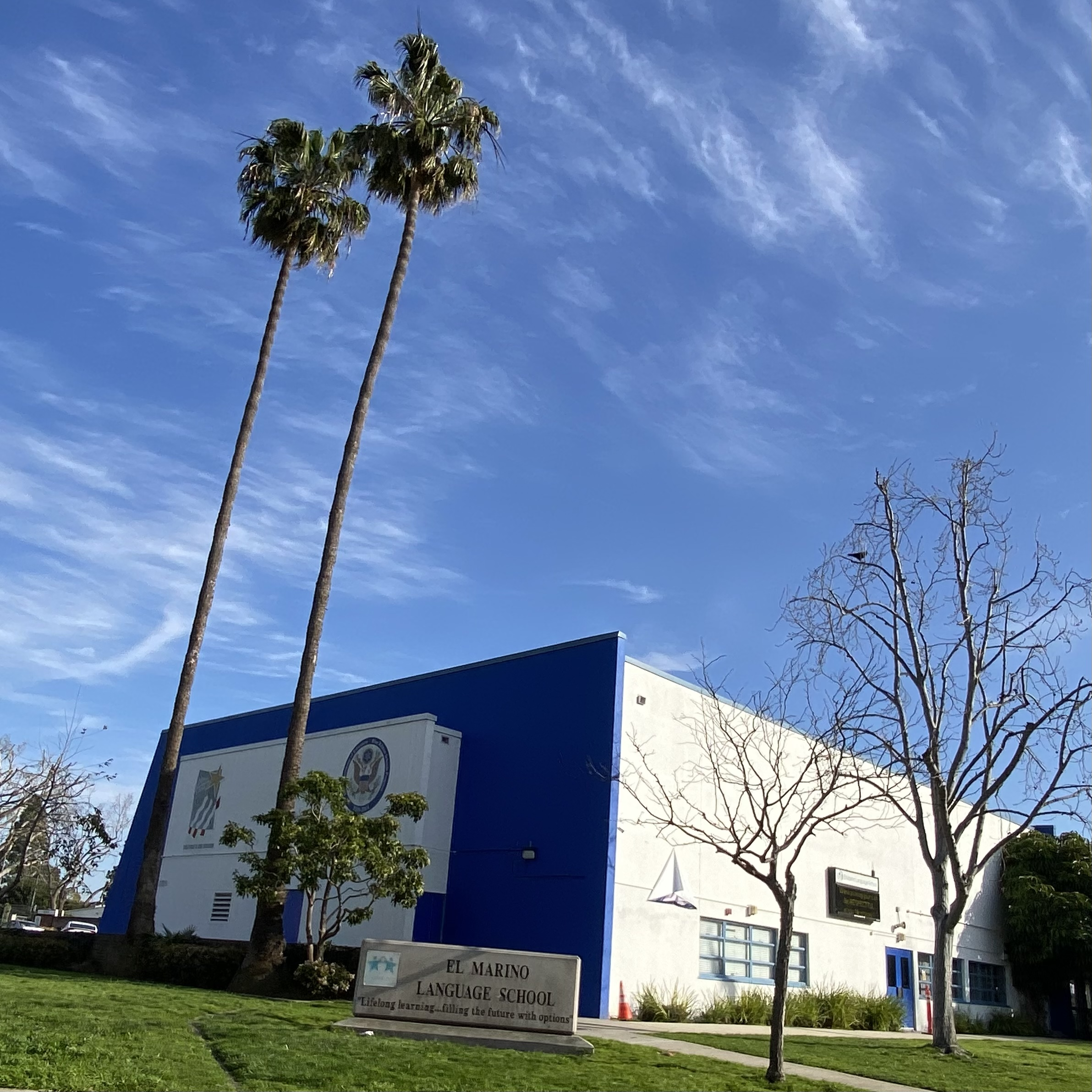
El Marino Language School

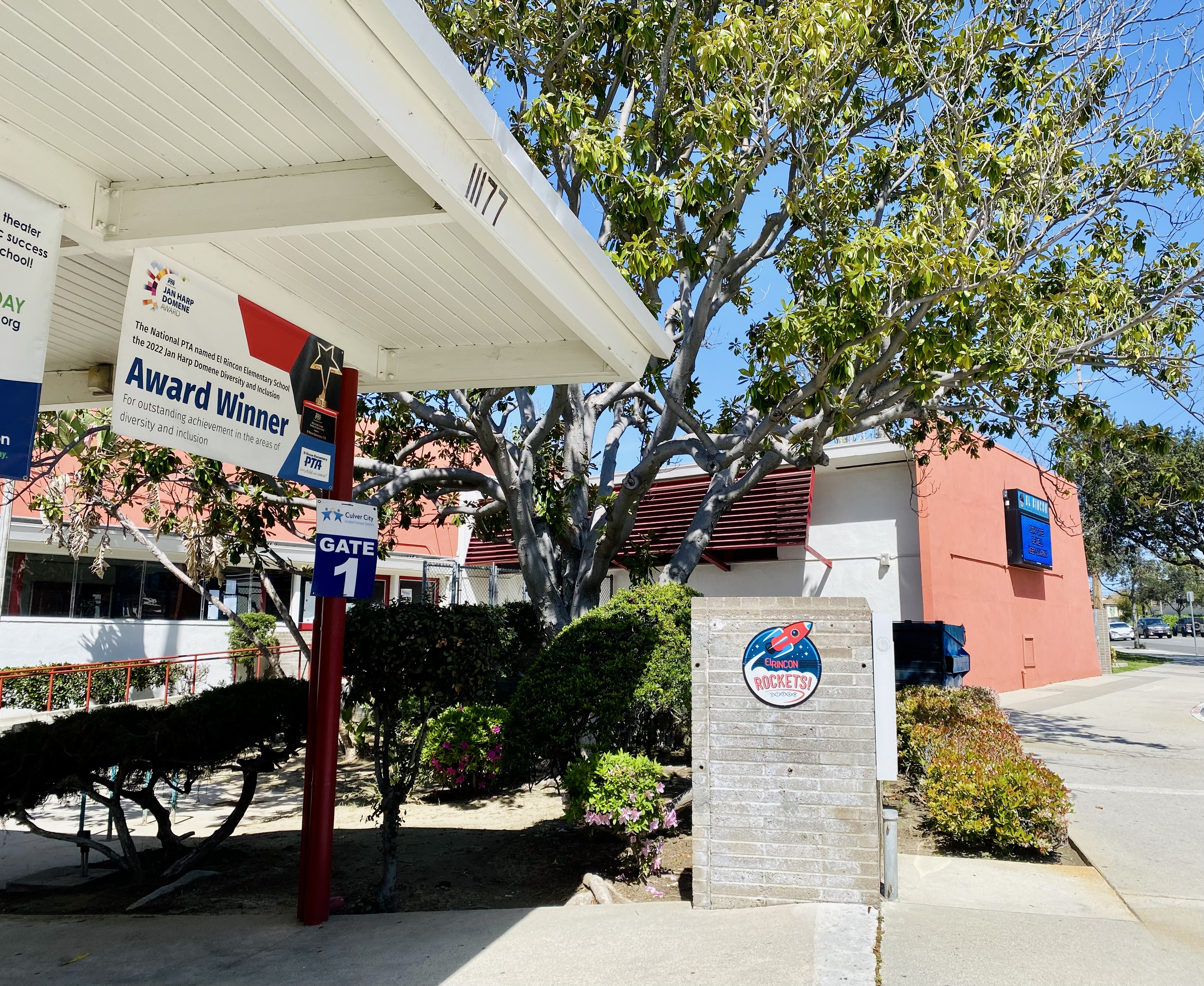
El Rincon School

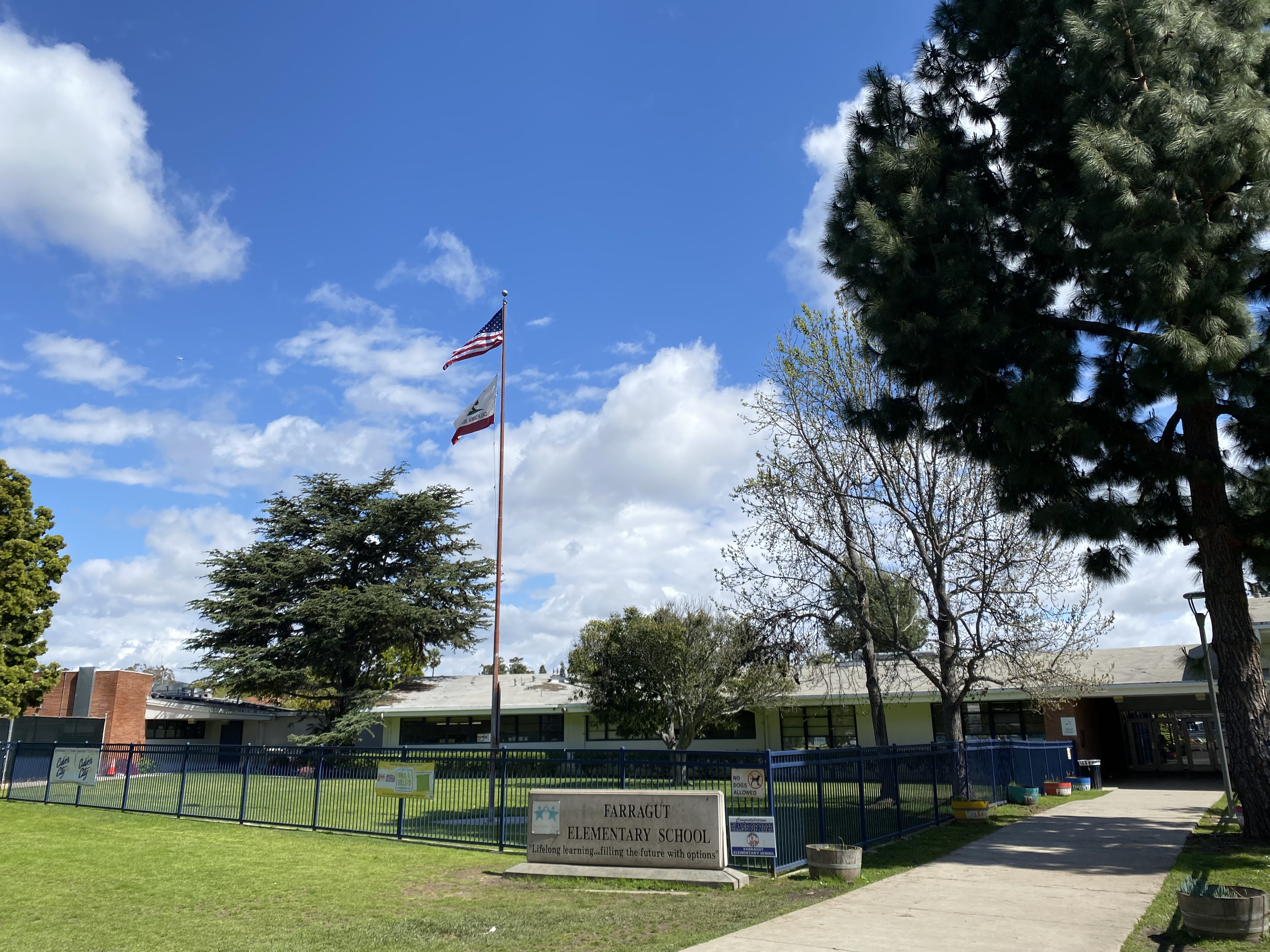
Farragut Elementary School

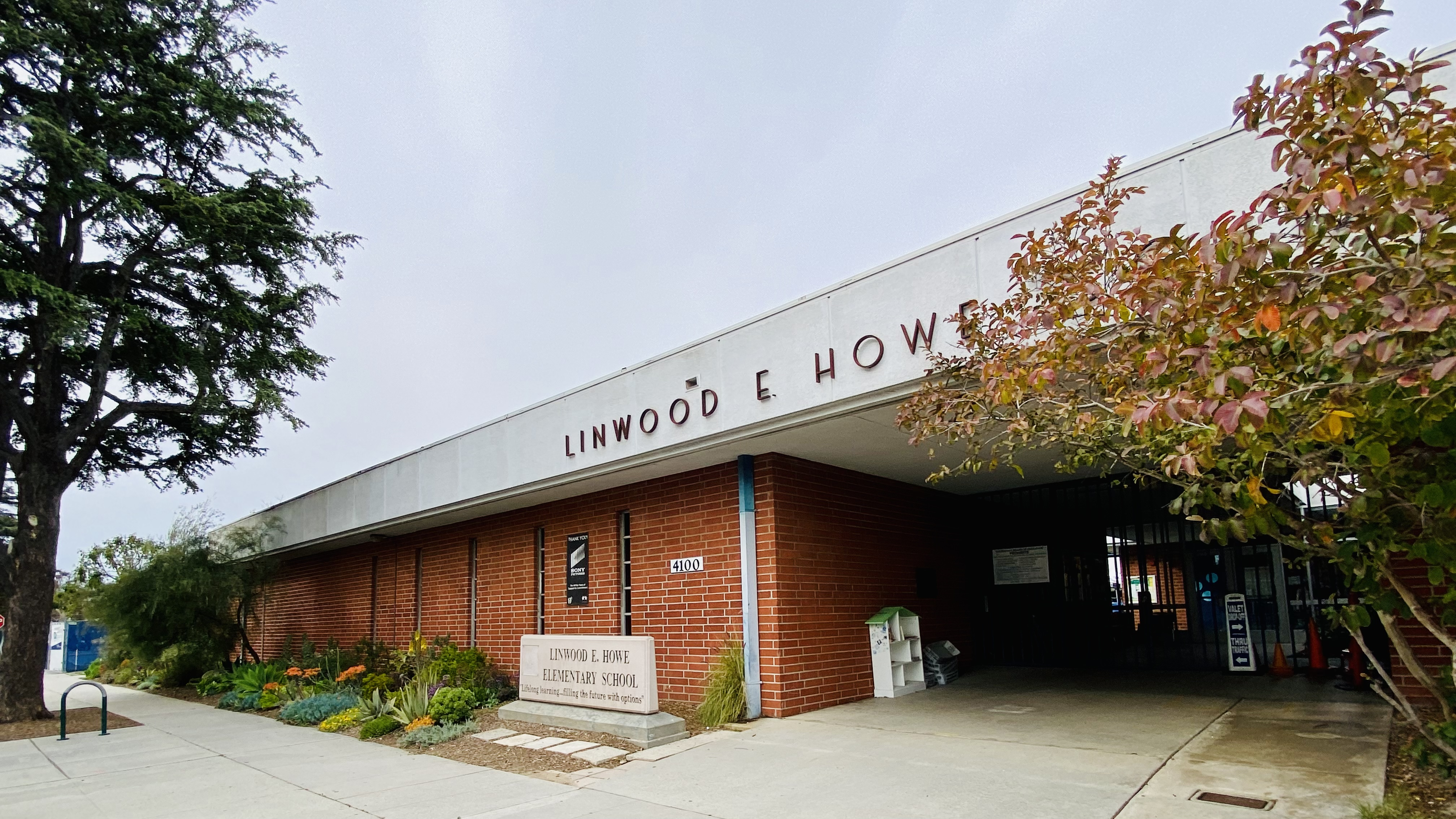
Linwood E. Howe Elementary School

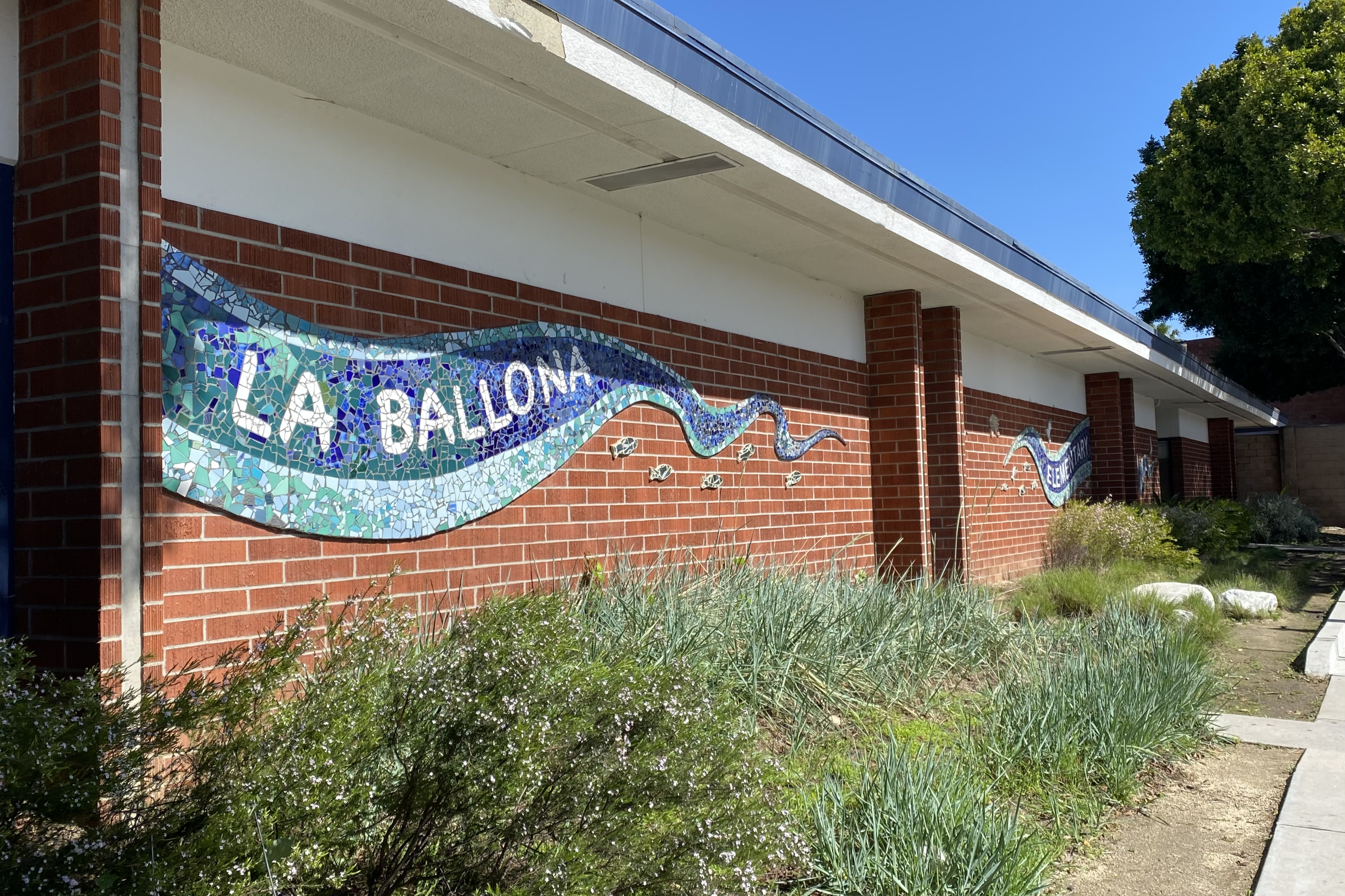
La Ballona Elementary School

=== Middle school ===
- Culver City Middle School (6-8), 4601 Elenda St. Culver City, CA
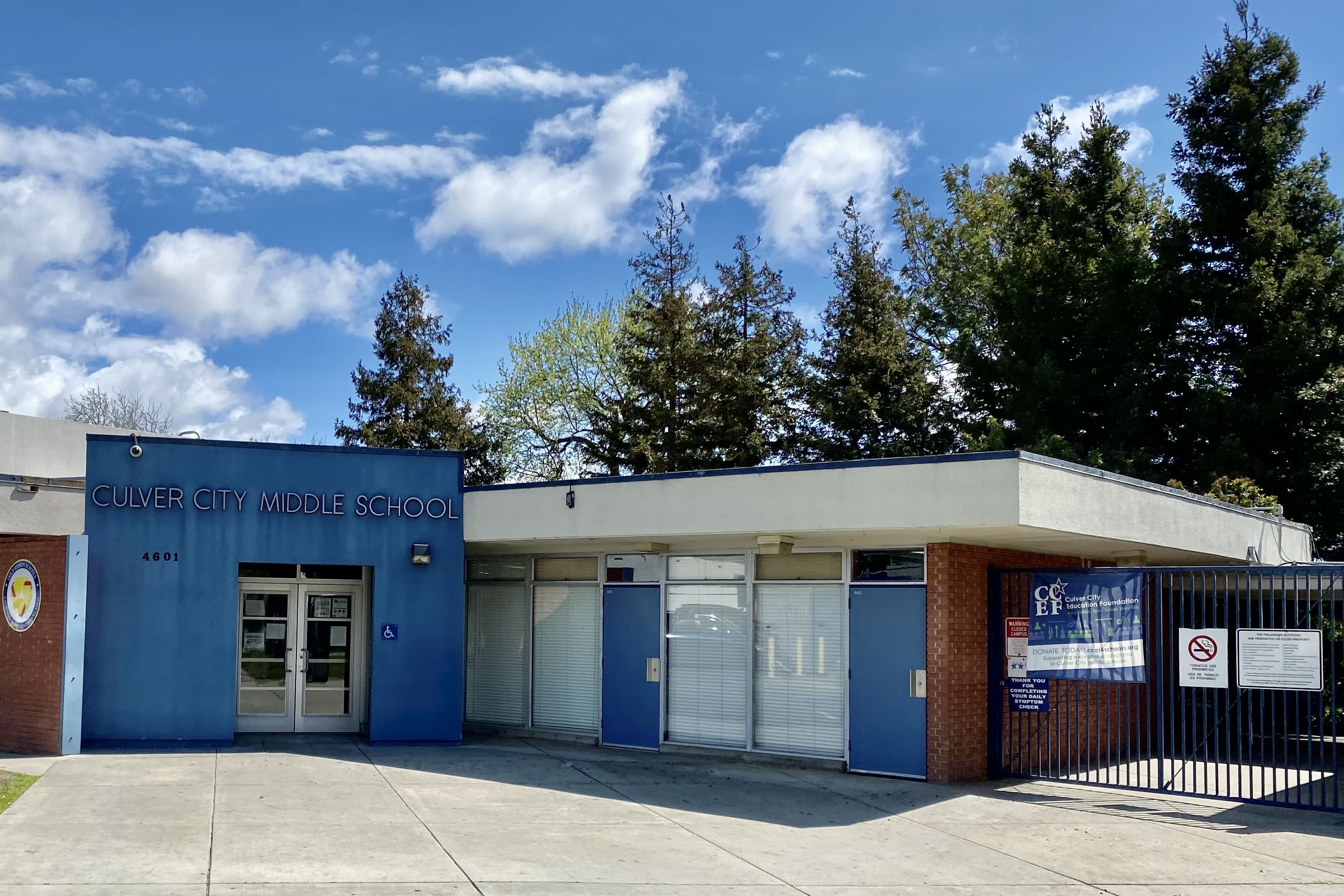
Culver City Middle School

=== High schools ===
- Culver City High School (9-12), 4401 Elenda St
- Culver Park Continuation High School 4601 Elenda St

=== Adult school ===
- Culver City Adult School, 4909 Overland Ave.

== Former Superintendents ==
- Dr. Brian Lucas
- Dr. Maria Martinez-Poulin (interim)
- Dr. Steven Keller (interim)
- Quoc Tran
- Leslie Lockhart
- Joshua Arnold
- Dave LaRose
- Myrna Rivera-Cote

== See also ==
- Culver City Academy of Visual and Performing Arts
- List of school districts in Los Angeles County, California
