= Motivated reasoning =

Processing personal/social information

Motivated reasoning is a mental process through which individuals access, construct, and evaluate their beliefs in response to new information or experiences where their biases cause them to arrive at desired conclusions. While most people may be more likely to arrive at conclusions they want, such desires are generally constrained by the ability to construct a reasonable justification.

Motivated reasoning may involve personal choices, such as continuing to smoke after encountering evidence of the health effects of tobacco, leading to personal justifications for doing so. Other beliefs have social and political significance, being associated with deeply held values and identities. Political reasoning involves the goal of identity protection or maintaining status within an affinity group united by shared values.

Current research in motivated reasoning has been affected by technological change, both in the methods used by researchers and in the behavior being studied. Researchers employ the methodology of neuroscience to provide data on brain functioning, rather than relying solely upon self-reports or observations of behavior. Much of the information used by people in forming beliefs now comes from broadcast or social media, which may support biased viewpoints, including conspiracy theories. To attract an audience, news media favor content that stimulate strong emotions, favoring news stories about threats to the beliefs or social identity of consumers.

== Definitions and history ==
A number of psychological concepts are related to how individuals respond to threats to their current beliefs. Due to the need for cognitive consistency, contradictory beliefs cause the stress defined as cognitive dissonance. Motivated reasoning is a process for relieving this stress by either modifying beliefs to incorporate the new evidence, or constructing a rationale for maintaining current beliefs. Confirmation bias is one of the means to do the latter, by seeking to find additional evidence to support current beliefs, to discredit the new information, or both.

As described in 1990 by Ziva Kunda, motivated reasoning takes two forms, a more rational "cold" motivation favoring accuracy; or "hot" motivation to reach a desired goal, usually to maintain current beliefs at the expense of rationality. This distinction has been controversial, some finding that apparently self-serving conclusions may be seen as plausible, rather than biased, based upon prior beliefs. Cognitive psychology was also dominated in the 1970s by research into biases that explained departures from rationality in terms of heuristics rather than affect. However, exploration of the underlying mechanisms finds that motivation plays a role in the outcome by determining which cognitive processes are used in a particular situation.

Early research on how humans evaluated and integrated information supported a cognitive approach consistent with Bayesian probability, in which individuals weighted new information using rational calculations ("cold cognition"). More recent theories endorse these cognitive processes as only partial explanations of motivated reasoning, but have also introduced motivational or affective (emotional) processes ("hot cognition").

Some research found a "tipping point" at which new information had accumulated to a level at which belief change occurred.

Motivated reasoning has become associated more often with efforts to maintain beliefs in the face of substantial contrary evidence, individuals or groups using different criteria for evaluating propositions they favor versus those they oppose. Extreme examples of refusal to accept the validity of beliefs that are well-supported by evidence is called denialism, while the invention of alternative "facts" is the basis of conspiracy theories.

== Categories ==
Motivated reasoning can be classified into two categories: 1) Accuracy-oriented (non-directional), in which the motive is to arrive at an accurate conclusion, irrespective of the individual's prior beliefs, and 2) goal-oriented (directional), in which the motive is to arrive at a particular conclusion favored based upon other considerations. Such considerations include identity protection and affirming shared values and norms. However, the question as to whether citizens, in making political decisions, are more likely to be rational or rationalizing has not been determined.

=== Accuracy-oriented motivated reasoning ===
Being motivated towards forming accurate beliefs is primary in situations that allow for the time and mental effort required for making correct decisions necessary for survival. However, many everyday decisions are made using mental shortcuts, or heuristics, that provide adequate results. Kunda asserts that accuracy goals delay the process of coming to a premature conclusion, in that accuracy goals increase both the quantity and quality of processing—particularly in leading to more complex inferential cognitive processing procedures. When researchers manipulated test subjects' motivation to be accurate by informing them that the target task was highly important or that they would be expected to defend their judgments, it was found that subjects utilized deeper processing and that there was less biasing of information. This was true when accuracy motives were present at the initial processing and encoding of information.

In reviewing a line of research on accuracy goals and bias, Kunda concludes, "several different kinds of biases have been shown to weaken in the presence of accuracy goals". However, accuracy goals do not always eliminate biases and improve reasoning: some biases (e.g. those resulting from using the availability heuristic) might be resistant to accuracy manipulations. For accuracy to reduce bias, the following conditions must be present:

1. Subjects must possess appropriate reasoning strategies.
2. They must view these as superior to other strategies.
3. They must be capable of using these strategies at will.

However, these last two conditions introduce the construct that accuracy goals include a conscious process of utilizing cognitive strategies in motivated reasoning. This construct is called into question by neuroscience research that concludes that motivated reasoning is qualitatively distinct from reasoning in which there is no strong emotional stake in the outcomes. Accuracy-oriented individuals who are thought to use "objective" processing can vary in information updating, depending on how much faith they place in a provided piece of evidence and inability to detect misinformation that can lead to beliefs that diverge from scientific consensus.

=== Goal-oriented motivated reasoning ===
Directional goals enhance the accessibility of knowledge structures (memories, beliefs, information) that are consistent with desired conclusions. According to Kunda, such goals can lead to biased memory search and belief construction mechanisms. Several studies support the effect of directional goals in selection and construction of beliefs about oneself, other people and the world.

Cognitive dissonance research provides extensive evidence that people may bias their self-characterizations when motivated to do so. Other biases such as confirmation bias, prior attitude effect and disconfirmation bias could contribute to goal-oriented motivated reasoning. For example, in one study, subjects altered their self-view by viewing themselves as more extroverted when induced to believe that extroversion was beneficial.

Michael Thaler of Princeton University, conducted a study that found that men are more likely than women to demonstrate performance-motivated reasoning due to a gender gap in beliefs about personal performance. After a second study was conducted the conclusion was drawn that both men and women are susceptible to motivated reasoning, but certain motivated beliefs can be separated into genders.

The motivation to achieve directional goals could also influence which rules (procedural structures, such as inferential rules) are accessed to guide the search for information. Studies also suggest that evaluation of scientific evidence may be biased by whether the conclusions are in line with the reader's beliefs.

In spite of goal-oriented motivated reasoning, people are not at liberty to conclude whatever they want merely because of that want. People tend to draw conclusions only if they can muster up supportive evidence. They search memory for those beliefs and rules that could support their desired conclusion or they could create new beliefs to logically support their desired goals.

==== Neuroscientific evidence ====
A neuroimaging study by Drew Westen and colleagues does not support the use of cognitive processes in motivated reasoning, lending greater support to affective processing as a key mechanism in supporting bias. This study, designed to test the neural circuitry of individuals engaged in motivated reasoning, found that motivated reasoning "was not associated with neural activity in regions previously linked with cold reasoning tasks [Bayesian reasoning] nor conscious (explicit) emotion regulation".

This neuroscience data suggests that "motivated reasoning is qualitatively distinct from reasoning when people do not have a strong emotional stake in the conclusions reached". However, if there is a strong emotion attached during their previous round of motivated reasoning and that emotion is again present when the individual's conclusion is reached, a strong emotional stake is then attached to the conclusion. Any new information in regards to that conclusion will cause motivated reasoning to reoccur. This can create pathways within the neural network that further ingrain the reasoned beliefs of that individual along similar neural networks to where logical reasoning occurs. This causes the strong emotion to reoccur when confronted with contradictory information, time and time again. This is referred to by Lodge and Taber as affective contagion. But instead of "infecting" other individuals, the emotion "infects" the individual's reasoning pathways and conclusions.

==== Reflective reasoning ====
Careful or "reflective" reasoning has been linked to both overcoming and reinforcing motivated reasoning, suggesting that reflection is not a panacea, but a tool that can be used for rational or irrational purposes depending on other factors. For example, when people are presented with and forced to think analytically about something complex that they lack adequate knowledge of (i.e. being presented with a new study on meteorology whilst having no degree in the subject), there is no directional shift in thinking, and their extant conclusions are more likely to be supported with motivated reasoning. Conversely, if they are presented with a more simplistic test of analytical thinking that confronts their beliefs (i.e., seeing implausible headlines as false), motivated reasoning is less likely to occur and a directional shift in thinking may result.

== Prevalence of conservative vs liberal bias ==
Peter Ditto and his students conducted a meta-analysis in 2018 of studies relating to political bias. Their aim was to assess which U.S. political orientation (left/liberal or right/conservative) was more biased and initiated more motivated reasoning. They found that both political orientations are susceptible to bias to the same extent. The analysis was disputed by Jonathan Baron and John Jost, to whom Ditto and colleagues responded. Reviewing the debate, Stuart Vyse concluded that the answer to the question of whether U.S. liberals or conservatives are more biased is: "We don't know".

== Examples ==
=== Personal decisions ===
Many instances of motivated reasoning in personal decisions are related to health, misinformation being used to justify continuing unhealthy behaviors or avoid recommended treatments.

==== Smoking ====
When an individual is trying to quit smoking, they might engage in motivated reasoning, focusing on information that makes smoking seem less harmful while discrediting evidence which emphasizes any dangers associated with the behavior. Individuals in situations like this are driven to initiate motivated reasoning to lessen the amount of cognitive dissonance they feel.

==== COVID-19 ====
In the context of the COVID-19 pandemic, people who refuse to wear masks or get vaccinated may engage in motivated reasoning to justify their beliefs and actions. They may reject scientific evidence that supports mask-wearing and vaccination and instead seek out information that supports their pre-existing beliefs, such as conspiracy theories or misinformation. This can lead to behaviors that are harmful to both themselves and others. In a 2024 study, Alberto Prati and Charlotte Saucet showed that motivated reasoning can extend also to vaccinated individuals. In the UK, participants assigned to either the Moderna or Pfizer vaccine came to see "their" vaccine as the safest and most effective, and misremembered it as their preferred option all along.

In a 2020 study, Van Bavel and colleagues explored the concept of motivated reasoning as a contributor to the spread of misinformation and resistance to public health measures during the COVID-19 pandemic. Their results indicated that people often engage in motivated reasoning when processing information about the pandemic, interpreting it to confirm their pre-existing beliefs and values. The authors argue that addressing motivated reasoning is critical to promoting effective public health messaging and reducing the spread of misinformation. They suggested several strategies, such as reframing public health messages to align with individuals' values and beliefs. In addition, they suggested using trusted sources to convey information by creating social norms that support public health behaviors.

=== Social/political decisions ===
Politically motivated reasoning involves processing new information in accord with the impact on an individual's beliefs and the beliefs of people in an identity-defining group, not truth-related norms. Views about political issues become symbolic of group membership. People tend to trust experts whom they believe share their perspectives, distrusting experts that do not. Information is processed in the context of values, and values influence opinions in predictable ways. In other words, voters view experts as trustworthy or untrustworthy based upon their group's values. Expertise is judged based upon the character, not reliability.

==== Climate change ====
Despite a scientific consensus on climate change, citizens are divided on the topic, particularly along political lines. Liberals and progressives generally believe, based on extensive evidence, that human activity is the main driver of climate change. By contrast, conservatives are generally much less likely to hold this belief, and a subset believes that there is no human involvement, and that the reported evidence is faulty (or even fraudulent).

==== Obama citizenship and religion ====
On April 22, 2011, The New York Times published a series of articles attempting to explain the Barack Obama citizenship conspiracy theories. One of these articles by political scientist David Redlawsk explained these "birther" conspiracies as an example of political motivated reasoning.

Despite ample evidence that President Barack Obama was born in the U.S. state of Hawaii, many people continue to believe that he was not born in the U.S., and therefore that he was an illegitimate president. Similarly, many people believe he is a Muslim (as was his father), despite ample lifetime evidence of his Christian beliefs and practice (as was true of his mother). Subsequent research by others suggested that political partisan identity was more important for motivating "birther" beliefs than for some other conspiracy beliefs such as 9/11 conspiracy theories.

==== Immigration ====
The theory of motivated reasoning plays a crucial role in shaping public beliefs about immigration, especially when it comes to political issues such as welfare access. Studies suggest that how information is presented to the public can significantly impact people's attitudes towards immigrants. For example, when certain information about immigrants is framed in a negative light, it has been shown to strengthen welfare prejudicial attitudes, especially among right wing individuals. This suggests that people's existing political ideologies might shape how they chose to interpret information, more often than not, reinforcing their pre-existing beliefs, a process that could be influenced by negatively biased and motivated reasoning.

In addition to ideological influences, cognitive factors can also affect how individuals interpret information related to the topic of immigration. Research shows that those with higher analytical abilities are less likely to engage in motivated reasoning when discussing immigration-related information. However, their reasoning could still be influenced by the topic at hand, such as gender or patriarchal quotas. This underlines the idea that motivated reasoning mechanisms can vary depending on the subject matter and the individual's cognitive traits. Some individuals are more influenced by personal views than others.

== Information sources ==
=== Social media ===
Social media is used for many different purposes and ways of spreading opinions. It is the number one place people go to get information and most of that information is complete opinion and bias. The way this applies to motivated reasoning is the way it spreads. "However, motivated reasoning suggests that informational uses of social media are conditioned by various social and cultural ways of thinking". All ideas and opinions are shared and makes it very easy for motivated reasoning and biases to come through when searching for an answer or just facts on the internet or any news source.

Social media platforms are frequently used to share individuals personal opinions, which oftentimes create echo chambers where users are exposed to content that aligns with their personal beliefs. Magdalena Wischenweski's research dives into how this dynamic functions, emphasizing the role of individuals' identities influence shaping these interactions with information. Her study uncovers that individuals are more likely to accept and share content that supports their views, while ignoring or rejecting certain contradictory information. Emotional reactions to identity-related content can also influence how users engage with fact-checking. Users tend to perceive opposing viewpoints and "inauthentic" or "automated", which further solidifies their beliefs. Wischnewski introduced the idea of identity-salience interventions, which underline shared identities to promote more balanced information evaluation. These interventions aim to decrease the impact of motivated reasoning and encourage a more objective approach to information.

=== News Media ===
Michael Thaler's 2024 paper examines how people may evaluate and assess the reliability of media sources, specifically relating to broadcast news. The finding was that participants significantly over-trust non-credible "Fake News" sources. It also asserts that the strong association with political beliefs could be a cause for intense levels of polarization. The results also confirm that motivated reasoning originates less from a misguided optimism than a desire to defend one's previously held political beliefs. Ultimately, it asserts misinformation presented attractively and agreeably to one's beliefs making them generally believe that it is more valid, credible, or trustworthy.

Another study expands on and explains this, exploring how long-held political opinions may influence morals and create strong beliefs held as unarguably factual. Barron, Becker, and Huck's paper elaborates on how identity shapes beliefs and, therefore, a desire for conformity. Minimal evidence supports that people do this for a self-serving purpose, but there is also a lack of evidence to show that they do it for others, creating new research questions. The study also concludes that motivated reasoning happens more often with political issues rather than economic ones.

==== Hostile media effect ====
Research on motivated reasoning tested accuracy goals (i.e., reaching correct conclusions) and directional goals (i.e., reaching preferred conclusions). Factors such as these affect perceptions; and results confirm that motivated reasoning affects decision-making and estimates. These results have far reaching consequences because, when confronted with a small amount of information contrary to an established belief, an individual is motivated to reason away the new information, contributing to a hostile media effect. If this pattern continues over an extended period of time, the individual becomes more entrenched in their beliefs.

== See also ==
- Cognitive miser – Psychological problem-solving tendency
- Emotional reasoning – Cognitive process
- Expressive responding – Expression of opinions in a survey that do not fit actual beliefs
- Intensity of preference – In contrast with ordinal utility, in economics
- Monroe's motivated sequence – Public speaking strategy
- Motivated forgetting – Psychological defense mechanism
- Motivated tactician – Social psychology description
- Rationalization – Psychological defense mechanism
