= Motivated tactician =

Social psychology description

In social psychology, a motivated tactician is someone who shifts between quick-and-dirty cognitively economical tactics and more thoughtful, thorough strategies when processing information, depending on the type and degree of motivation. Such behavior is a type of motivated reasoning. The idea has been used to explain why people use stereotyping, biases and categorization in some situations, and more analytical thinking in others.

== History ==
After much research on categorization, and other cognitive shortcuts, psychologists began to describe human beings as cognitive misers; which explains that a need to conserve mental resources causes people to use shortcuts to thinking about stimuli, instead of motivations and urges influencing the way humans think about their world. Stereotypes and heuristics were used as evidence of the economic nature of human thinking. In recent years, the work of Fiske & Neuberg (1990), Higgins & Molden (2003), Molden & Higgins (2005) and others has led to the recognition of the importance of motivational thinking. This is due to contemporary research studying the importance of motivation in cognitive processes, instead of concentrating on cognition versus motivation. Current research does not deny that people will be cognitively miserly in certain situations, but it takes into account that thorough analytic thought does occur in other situations.

Using this perspective, researchers have begun to describe human beings as "motivated tacticians" who are tactical about how much cognitive resources will be used depending on the individual's intent and level of motivation. Based on the complex nature of the world and the occasional need for quick thinking, it would be detrimental for a person to be methodical about everything, while other situations require more focus and attention. Considering human beings as motivated tacticians has become popular because it takes both situations into account. This concept also takes into account, and continues to study, what motivates people to use more or less mental resources when processing information about the world. Research has found that intended outcome, relevancy to the individual, culture, and affect can all influence the way a person processes information.

== Goal-oriented motivational thinking ==
The most prominent explanation of motivational thinking is that the person's desired outcome motivates him to use more or less cognitive resources while processing a situation or thing. Researchers have divided preferred outcomes into two broad categories: directional and non-directional outcomes. The preferred outcome provides the motivation for the level of processing involved.

Individuals motivated by directional outcomes have the intention of accomplishing a specific goal. These goals can range from appearing smart, courageous or likeable to affirming positive thoughts and feelings about something or someone to whom they are close or find likable. If someone is motivated by non-directional outcomes, he or she may wish to make the most logical and clear decision. Whether a person is motivated by directional or non-directional outcomes depends on the situation and the person's goals. Confirmation bias is an example of thought-processing motivated by directional outcomes. The goal is to affirm previously held beliefs, so one will use less thorough thinking in order to reach that goal. A person motivated to get the best education, who researches information on colleges and visit schools is motivated by a non-directional outcome. Evidence for outcome-influenced motivation is illustrated by research on self-serving bias. According to Miller (1976),

"Independent of expectancies from prior success or failure, the more personally important a success is in any given situation, the stronger is the tendency to claim responsibility for this success but to deny responsibility for failure."

== Motivation based on strategy ==
Though outcome-based motivation is the most prominent approach to motivated thinking, there is evidence that a person can be motivated by their preferred strategy of processing information. However, rather than being an alternative, this idea is actually a compliment to the outcome-based approach. Proponents of this approach feel that a person prefers a specific method of information-processing because it usually yields the results they wish to receive. This relates back to the intended outcome being the primary motivation. "Strategy of information processing" means whether a person makes a decision using bias, categories, or analytical thinking. Regardless of whether the method is best suited for the situation or more thorough is less important to the person than its likelihood of yielding the intended result. People feel that their preferred strategy just "feels right". What makes the heuristic or method feel "right" is that the strategy accomplishes the desired goal (i.e. affirming positive beliefs of self-efficacy).

== Other motivations and approaches ==
There has been limited research on motivated tactical thinking outside of Western countries. One theory experts have mentioned is that a person's culture could play a large role in a person's motivations. Nations like the United States are considered to be individualistic, while many Asian nations are considered to be collectivistic. An individualist emphasizes importance on the self and is motivated by individual reward and affirmation, while a collectivist sees the world as being more group- or culture-based. The difference in the two ways of thinking could affect motivation in information processing. For example, instead of being motivated by self-affirmation, a collectivist would be motivated by more group-affirming goals.

Another theory is that emotions can affect the way a person processes information. Forgas (2000) has stated that current mood can determine the information processing as well as thoroughness of thought. He also mentioned that achieving a desired emotion can influence the level to which information is processed.

== See also ==
- Cognitive miser – Psychological problem-solving tendency
- Continuum model of impression formation – Model in social psychology
- Flipism – Practice or personal philosophy in which all decisions are made by flipping a coin
- Goal orientation – Social-cognitive motivational disposition
- Goal theory – Psychological theory about goals
- Information processing (psychology) – Approach to understanding human thinking
- Regulatory focus theory – Questionnaire designed to measure prevention focus and promotion focus
