= Lyle Ungar =

American computer scientist

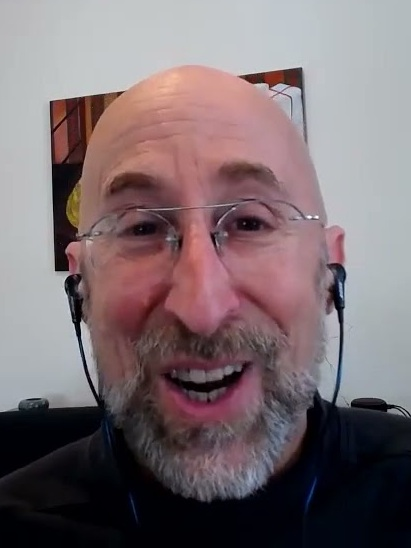
Image of Lyle Ungar

Lyle H. Ungar is a machine learning researcher and professor of Computer and Information Science at the University of Pennsylvania. He is also affiliated with the psychology department at the university.

== Research ==
Ungar's published research has been primarily in the area of machine learning, specifically text mining. According to his website, his research group "develops scalable machine learning and text mining methods, including clustering, feature selection, and semi-supervised and multi-task learning for natural language, psychology, and medical research. Example projects include spectral learning of language models, multi-view learning for gene expression and MRI data, and mining social media to better understand personality and well-being."

Ungar has also done some research in the domain of forecasting, in connection with his membership in The Good Judgment Project, a collaborator of the Aggregative Contingent Estimation (ACE) program of the Intelligence Advanced Research Projects Agency (IARPA).

== Affiliations ==
Ungar is a member of many associations and bodies devoted to advancing machine learning and related areas. These include the Annenberg Public Policy Center, Center for Cognitive Neuroscience, and Institute for Research in Cognitive Science. He is also a member of The Good Judgment Project. He is also a science advisory board member at Spark Park.
