= Exploratory thought =

Psychological concept in reasoning

Exploratory thought is an academic term used in the field of psychology to describe reasoning that neutrally considers multiple points of view and tries to anticipate all possible objections to, or flaws in, a particular position, with the goal of seeking truth. The opposite of exploratory thought is confirmatory thought, which is reasoning designed to construct justification supporting a specific point of view.

Both terms were coined by social psychologist Jennifer Lerner and psychology professor Philip Tetlock in the 2002 book Emerging Perspectives in Judgment and Decision Making. The authors argue that most people, most of the time, make decisions based on gut feelings and poor logic, and reason through issues primarily to provide justification, to themselves and to others, of what they already believe.

Lerner and Tetlock say that when people expect to need to justify their position to external parties, and they already know those parties' views, they will tend to adopt a similar position to theirs, and then engage in confirmatory thought with the goal of bolstering their own credibility rather than reaching a good conclusion. However, if the external parties are overly aggressive or critical, people will disengage from thought altogether, and simply assert their personal opinions without justification. Lerner and Tetlock say that people only push themselves to think critically and logically when they know in advance they will need to explain themselves to external parties who are well-informed, genuinely interested in the truth, and whose views they don't already know. Because those conditions rarely exist, they argue, most people are engaging in confirmatory thought most of the time.

== In statistics ==
Princeton statistician John Tukey wrote about selection between confirmation or rejection of existing hypotheses and exploration of new ones, focusing on how practicing statisticians might decide between the two modes of thought at various junctures. Subsequent statisticians, philosophers of science, and organizational psychologists have expanded on the topic.

== See also ==
- Empirical research
- Exploratory research
- Impartiality
- Neutrality (philosophy)
