= The Good Judgment Project =

Crowd-sourced event prediction

The Good Judgment Project (GJP) is an organization dedicated to "harnessing the wisdom of the crowd to forecast world events". It was co-created by Philip E. Tetlock (author of Superforecasting: The Art and Science of Prediction and Expert Political Judgment), decision scientist Barbara Mellers, and Don Moore, all professors at the University of Pennsylvania.

The project began as a participant in the Aggregative Contingent Estimation (ACE) program of the Intelligence Advanced Research Projects Activity (IARPA). It then extended its crowd wisdom to commercial activities, recruiting forecasters and aggregating the predictions of the most historically accurate among them to forecast future events. Predictions are scored using Brier scores. The top forecasters in GJP are "reportedly 30% better than intelligence officers with access to actual classified information."

== History ==
The Good Judgment Project began in July 2011 in collaboration with the Aggregative Contingent Estimation (ACE) Program at IARPA (IARPA-ACE). The first contest began in September 2011. GJP was one of many entrants in the IARPA-ACE tournament, which posed around 100 to 150 questions each year on geopolitical events. The GJP research team gathered a large number of talented amateurs (rather than geopolitical subject matter experts), gave them basic tutorials on forecasting best practice and overcoming cognitive biases, and created an aggregation algorithm to combine the individual predictions of the forecasters. GJP won both seasons of the contest, and were 35% to 72% more accurate than any other research team. Starting with the summer of 2013, GJP were the only research team IARPA-ACE was still funding, and GJP participants had access to the Integrated Conflict Early Warning System.

== People ==
The co-leaders of the GJP include Philip Tetlock, Barbara Mellers and Don Moore. The website lists a total of about 30 team members, including the co-leaders as well as David Budescu, Lyle Ungar, Jonathan Baron, and prediction-markets entrepreneur Emile Servan-Schreiber. The advisory board included Daniel Kahneman, Robert Jervis, J. Scott Armstrong, Michael Mauboussin, Carl Spetzler and Justin Wolfers. The study employed several thousand people as volunteer forecasters. Using personality-trait tests, training methods and strategies the researchers at GJP were able to select forecasting participants with less cognitive bias than the average person; as the forecasting contest continued the researchers were able to further down select these individuals in groups of so-called superforecasters. The last season of the GJP enlisted a total of 260 superforecasters.

== Research ==
A significant amount of research has been conducted based on the Good Judgment Project by the people involved with it. The results show that harnessing a blend of statistics, psychology, training and various levels of interaction between individual forecasters, consistently produced the best forecast for several years in a row.

== Good Judgment Inc. ==
A commercial spin-off of the Good Judgment Project started to operate on the web in July 2015 under the name Good Judgment Inc. Their services include forecasts on questions of general interest, custom forecasts, and training in Good Judgment's forecasting techniques. Starting in September 2015, Good Judgment Inc has been running a public forecasting tournament at the Good Judgment Open site. Like the Good Judgment Project, Good Judgment Open has questions about geopolitical and financial events, although it also has questions about US politics, entertainment, and sports.

== Media coverage ==
GJP has repeatedly been discussed in The Economist. GJP has also been covered in The New York Times, The Washington Post, and Co.Exist. NPR aired a segment on The Good Judgment Project by the title "So You Think You're Smarter Than a CIA Agent", on April 2, 2014. The Financial Times published an article on the GJP on September 5, 2014. Washingtonian published an article that mentioned the GJP on January 8, 2015. The BBC and The Washington Post published articles on the GJP respectively on January 20, 21, and 29, 2015.

The Almanac of Menlo Park published a story on the GJP on January 29, 2015. An article on the GJP appeared on the portal of the Philadelphia Inquirer, Philly.com, on February 4, 2015. The book Wiser: Getting Beyond Groupthink to Make Groups Smarter has a section detailing the involvement of the GJP in the tournament run by IARPA. Psychology Today published online a short article summarizing the paper by Mellers, et al., that wraps up the main findings of the GJP.

The project spawned a 2015 book by Tetlock and coauthored by Dan Gardner, Superforecasting - The Art and Science of Prediction, which divulges the main findings of the research conducted with the data from the GJP. Co-author Gardner had already published a book in 2010, that quoted previous research by Tetlock that seeded the GJP effort. The Economist reviewing the book said that superforecasters are clever (with a good mental attitude), but not necessarily geniuses. It reports on the treasure trove of data coming from The Good Judgment Project, showing that accurately selected amateur forecasters (and the confidence they had in their forecasts) were often more accurately tuned than experts. According to Jason Zweig, writing in The Wall Street Journal's Moneybeat blog in 2015, Superforecasting is "The most important book on decision making since Daniel Kahneman's Thinking, Fast and Slow." On the other hand, Klaus Solberg Søilen reviewing the book for the Journal of Intelligence Studies in Business was very critical, saying that the book did not give enough information on how the Good Judgment Project beat other forecasters.The Harvard Business Review paired it with the book How Not to Be Wrong: The Power of Mathematical Thinking by Jordan Ellenberg. On September 30, 2015, NPR aired an episode of the Colin McEnroe Show centering on the GJP and the book Superforecasting; guests on the show were Tetlock, IARPA Director Jason Matheny, and superforecaster Elaine Rich.

== See also ==
- Wisdom of the crowd
- Aggregative Contingent Estimation
- Intelligence Advanced Research Projects Activity
- SciCast
