= Don A. Moore (academic) =

American academic

- Born: 1970 (age 55–56)
- Education: Carleton College, Northwestern University
- Occupation: Professor
- Website: learnmoore.org

Don Andrew Moore (born 1970) is an author, academic, and professor. He is the Lorraine Tyson Mitchell Chair I of Leadership and Communication at UC Berkeley's Haas School of Business where he teaches classes on leadership, negotiation, and decision making.

== Education ==
Moore attended Carleton College, graduating in 1993 with a degree in psychology. He earned master's (1998) and doctoral degrees (2000) from the Kellogg Graduate School of Management, Northwestern University.

== Career ==
Moore is a professor at UC Berkeley's Haas School of Business where he has been on faculty since 2010. At Haas he has served as Associate Dean for Academic Affairs and (for 3 months) as Acting Dean.

Moore is primarily known for his work in behavioral economics, with a focus on decision making and overconfidence.

He was among the co-leaders of the Good Judgment Project, a forecasting tournament that predicted geopolitical events. The project was sponsored by the U.S. government's Intelligence Advanced Research Projects Activity (IARPA).

He has published three books: Judgment and Managerial Decision Making and Decision Leadership, both co-authored with Max Bazerman, as well as Perfectly Confident: How to Calibrate Your Decisions Wisely.
