= SciCast =

SciCast is a collaborative platform for science and technology forecasting created by George Mason University with the help of a grant from the Intelligence Advanced Research Projects Activity (IARPA) as part of its ForeST (Forecasting in Science and Technology) program. SciCast is currently (January 2016) on hiatus, after losing its main IARPA funding. It was expected to re-open in the fall of 2015 with the support of a major Science & Technology sponsor, but this had not occurred by January 2016.

== History ==
SciCast was an outgrowth of an earlier project called DAGGRE (Decomposition-Based Elicitation and Aggregation), also an IARPA project that implemented GMU economist Robin Hanson's idea of combinatorial prediction tech markets, and was a participant in the IARPA Aggregative Contingent Estimation tournament.

The launch of SciCast itself was announced by Robin Hanson on January 3, 2014, and the official announcements were made on January 10, 2014. The launch received some news coverage in March 2014.

== Reception ==
SciCast has been covered in The Chicago Tribune repeatedly.

The launch of SciCast was picked up by many blogs and websites of data analysis and technology trends. SciCast's crowdsourced search for the missing Malaysia Airlines Flight 370 airliner attracted the attention of some analysts.

== See also ==
- Aggregative Contingent Estimation
- Intelligence Advanced Research Projects Activity
- The Good Judgment Project
