= Barbara Mellers =

American psychologist

Barbara A. Mellers
- Education: University of California, Berkeley; University of Illinois at Urbana–Champaign
- Scientific career
- Fields: Psychology
- Thesis: Equity judgment: A revision of Aristotelian views (1981)
- Doctoral advisor: Michael H. Birnbaum

Barbara Ann Mellers is the I. George Heyman University Professor of Psychology at the University of Pennsylvania. Her research focuses on decision processes.

In 2017, Harvard University’s Kennedy School of Government awarded Mellers the Thomas C. Schelling Award in recognition of "remarkable intellectual work has had a transformative impact on public policy."

She worked with the Nobel Prize-winning economist and psychologist Daniel Kahneman to analyze the research of Matthew Killingsworth to help come to a consensus on how money and wealth influences happiness.

== Education ==
Mellers earned her undergraduate degree in psychology from the University of California, Berkeley in 1974. She went on to do graduate work in psychology at the University of Illinois at Urbana–Champaign, earning an M.A. in 1978 and a Ph.D. in 1981.

== Career ==
Mellers' research focuses on decision processes. She conducts both laboratory and field experimental work that examine human decision-making and its implications for politics and public policy.

Prior to joining the University of Pennsylvania, Mellers was professor of marketing and organizational behavior at the University of California, Berkeley.

Mellers is a co-founder of the Good Judgment Project, with colleagues Philip Tetlock and Don Moore. The project began in a competition funded by the United States' government's Intelligence Advanced Research Projects Activity. Mellers, Tetlock and Moore won with their crowdsourced approach to geopolitical and economic forecasting, which outperformed the government's own intelligence analysts' forecasts.

== Personal life ==
Mellers is married to Philip Tetlock, who is also a University of Pennsylvania professor.
