= Carl Spetzler =

American businessman, author and academic

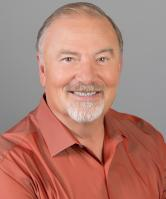
- Known for: Research, publications, and expertise in the fields of decision quality and decision theory

Carl Spetzler is an American businessman, author, and academic. He is known for his research, publications, and expertise in the fields of decision quality and decision theory.

== Education ==
Spetzler holds a BS in chemical engineering and an MBA and Ph.D. in economics and business administration from the Illinois Institute of Technology.

== Career ==
Spetzler’s interest in decision quality began at the Stanford Research Institute (SRI) at Stanford University (now known as SRI International), where he worked with decision theory pioneer Ronald A. Howard.

While at SRI, Spetzler was instrumental in helping client Merrill Lynch establish their Cash Management Account (CMA) product in 1977. Revolutionary for its time, the CMA was a great success for Merrill Lynch and inspired its competitors to introduce similar products. Author Joe Nocera describes Spetzler’s key role in the development of the CMA in his book A Piece of the Action: How the Middle Class Joined the Money Class.

In 1981, Spetzler and Howard formed Strategic Decisions Group (SDG), a management consulting firm focused on using the principles of decision quality to help organizations improve their strategic planning, innovation, and risk management.

Spetzler is the Chairman and CEO of SDG. He also serves as the program director of the Strategic Decision and Risk Management Program at Stanford’s Center for Professional Development.

== Publications ==
Spetzler is the author of Decision Quality: Value Creation from Better Business Decisions, written with Hannah Winter and Jennifer Meyer. Decision Quality explores Spetzler’s decision-making framework, including the six requirements for decision quality, how to apply them, and common pitfalls of decision-making.

=== Journal Publications ===
The Development of a Corporate Risk Policy for Capital Investment Decisions, Carl Spetzler, IEEE Transactions on Systems Science and Cybernetics (Volume: 4, Issue: 3 ), Sept. 1968.

Probability Coding in Decision Analysis, Carl S. Spetzler, Carl-Axel S. Staël Von Holstein, (1975), Management Science, 22(3):340-358, retrieved September 1, 2016.

Larry Neal and Carl Spetzler, "An Organization-Wide Approach to Good Decision Making", Harvard Business Review, May 27, 2015.

== Honors, memberships, and awards ==
=== Honors and Awards ===
- SRI International inducted Spetzler into its “Hall of Fame” in 2006 for his work in decision analysis and his influential work with Merrill Lynch.
- In 2004, the Institute for Operations Research and the Management Sciences (INFORMS) awarded Spetzler the Frank P. Ramsey Medal which honors outstanding contributions to the field of decision analysis.
- Treasury & Risk Magazine named Spetzler to its 2008 list of 100 Most Influential People in Finance.

=== Memberships ===
- Society of Decision Professionals
- Board of Trustees Member, Illinois Institute of Technology
- Board Member, Decision Education Foundation
- Advisory Board, The Good Judgment Project
