= Lisa Porter =

American scientist

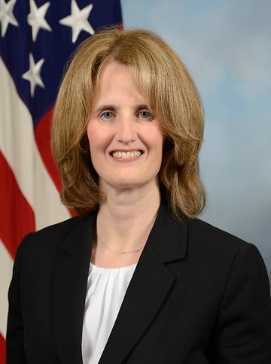
- 1st director of IARPA
- Citizenship: American
- Education: MIT; Stanford University
- Awards: Secretary of Defense Medal for Exceptional Public Service (2005); NASA Outstanding Leadership Medal (2008); National Intelligence Distinguished Service Medal (2012); Presidential Meritorious Rank Award (2013)
- Scientific career
- Workplaces: DARPA; NASA; IARPA; Teledyne Technologies; In-Q-Tel
- Thesis: Wave heating of the solar corona (1994)
- Doctoral advisor: Peter A. Sturrock

Lisa J. Porter is an American scientist and founding Director of the Intelligence Advanced Research Projects Activity. Prior to this position, she was the Associate Administrator for Aeronautics Research at NASA and a senior scientist in the Advanced Technology Office of the Defense Advanced Research Projects Agency.

In March 2012, Porter resigned from IARPA. Director of National Intelligence James Clapper remarked in Wired that her hallmark as a leader was bringing together the nation's top scientific thinkers to solve difficult problem. She joined Teledyne Technologies as senior vice president of the subsidiary Teledyne Scientific & Imaging. She later joined In-Q-Tel as executive vice president and director of In-Q-Tel Labs.

Porter is the Deputy Under Secretary of Defense for Research and Engineering, a newly created position. After her confirmation by the United States Senate, she again will be reporting to Under Secretary of Defense Michael Griffin, her former supervisor at NASA. In her role as DUSD(R&E), Porter helped USD(R&E) Griffin established technology modernization priorities for the DoD.

In 2009, as the Director of IARPA, Porter cancelled the US Quantum Communications Satellite program nine months before launch. On June 24, 2020, Lisa Porter tendered her resignation effective July 10, 2020 to pursue opportunities in the private sector.

== Education ==
Porter graduated from MIT with a bachelor's degree in nuclear engineering in 1989, where she also took courses in Russian language and literature. She graduated from Stanford University in 1994 with her doctorate in applied physics, where she worked on corona physics with data from the Yohkoh solar observatory. She then worked as a postdoctoral fellow at MIT. She received the Office of the Secretary of Defense Medal for Exceptional Public Service in 2005, the NASA Outstanding Leadership Medal in 2008, the National Intelligence Distinguished Service Medal in 2012, and the Presidential Meritorious Rank Award in 2013.
