= Max H. Bazerman =

American behavioral economist (born 1955)

- Born: August 14, 1955 (age 71)
- Other name: Max Hal Bazerman

Academic background
- Education: University of Pennsylvania; Carnegie Mellon University
- Thesis: Personal control in orgainizations (1979)
- Doctoral advisor: Robert S. Atkin

Max Hal Bazerman (born August 14, 1955) is an American behavioral economist, business theorist, and author whose work focuses on negotiation, business ethics.

In his most recent book, Better, Not Perfect, Bazerman provides insight into how individuals can make better decisions for themselves and for the world. In their 2020 book The Power of Experiments, Bazerman and Michael Luca describe how technology companies and other organizations are increasingly relying on randomized control trials to test their ideas, generating both benefits and costs for society at large. Bazerman is the Jesse Isidor Straus Professor of Business Administration at Harvard Business School. In 2019, he received the Lifetime Achievement Award from the Organizational Behavior Division of the Academy of Management.

== Education ==
Bazerman received a Bachelor of Sciences degree in Economics from the Wharton School of the University of Pennsylvania in 1976 and a Ph.D. from the Graduate School of Industrial Administration at Carnegie Mellon University in 1979, under the supervision of Robert S. Atkin. Bazerman received an honorary Master of Arts degree from Harvard University in 2000 and an honorary doctorate from the London Business School of the University of London in 2006.

== Career ==
Since 2000, Bazerman has been the Jesse Isidor Straus Professor of Business Administration at Harvard Business School. He has been with the school since 1998 as a visiting scholar. From 1985-2000, Bazerman was a professor at the Kellogg School of Management.

In 2021, a paper from 2012 written by Francesca Gino, Nina Mazar, Lisa L Shu, Dan Ariely, and Bazerman was discovered to be based on falsified data and was subsequently retracted.

== Notable work ==
“Max Bazerman has had an important impact over many years in the area of decision making in organizations," wrote the award committee that granted Bazerman the Lifetime Achievement Award from the Organizational Behavior Division of the Academy of Management. "Even more impactful, however, is his research on negotiations in organizations. Not only is it foundational, but coupled with the developmental aspects of instructional materials based on his research it has transformed the topic of negotiations into a near universal part of all MBA programs. The instructional approach he developed with his colleagues constitutes the basis of the vast majority of those programs. His work as a doctoral student advisor has also led to an extremely large number of important faculty at top institutions who evidence his commitment to excellence in scholarship, teaching, and service."

The award committee concludes: "Max Bazerman has for several decades been the central figure and driving force behind several related domains of organizational behavior: negotiations, judgement and decision making, and more recently, behavioral ethics. That he has managed to bring the rigor of scholarly inquiry to these areas while also spear-heading evidence-based practice is remarkable. Add to it, his family tree of doctoral trainees is itself a “who’s-who” of influential management scholars.”

Bazerman's ethics research reveals the psychology underlying unethical behavior. He has been quoted as an expert many times in the New York Times and in other publications and trade journals. Bazerman and his colleagues have studied the psychology that underlies accounting fraud, such as how to prevent fraud that occurred at companies such as Enron.

=== Whistleblower ===
Bazerman was hired as a remedy witness on the civil action case involving Philip Morris and United States Department of Justice. He was hired by the US Department of Justice to make recommendations about the penalties against the company and its senior executives under the assumption that the court had found Philip Morris guilty. Bazerman was paid $800 an hour, which he decided to donate to an irrevocable charitable trust in an effort to negate any potential bias since he was employed by the Justice Department.

Bazerman recommended removing Philip Morris' senior management, creating court-appointed monitors, having research done by private companies also monitored by the court, eliminating incentive and compensation for selling tobacco products to children, and changing promotion policies to deter misconduct. Bazerman also recommended that managers should be educated on ways to handle biases in decision.

Bazerman was scheduled to testify on May 4, 2005. On April 30, Bazerman says that he was approached by a Justice Department attorney who asked him to change his testimony. If Bazerman didn't comply, he would be removed from the case. Bazerman refused and testified as planned.

Bazerman says that even though he knew something was wrong, he didn't take action immediately. It wasn't until June 17, he read a story in The New York Times about Mathew Myers, president of Tobacco Free Kids, who has also testified on the same case. Myers claimed that Robert McCallum Jr., a top U.S. Department of Justice official, tried to persuade Myers to change his testimony.

Bazerman then made his own accusation, reported by The Washington Post, that a senior Department of Justice official asked him to water down his testimony. Since then, Bazerman has described his failure to notice the unethical interference sooner as an example of the widespread failure to notice unethical behavior. Bazerman's research shows that people often behave unethically without conscious awareness.

== Publication ==
=== Books ===
- Bazerman, Max. Better, Not Perfect: A Realist's Guide to Maximum Sustainable Goodness. Harper Business, 2020.
- Luca, Michael, and Max H. Bazerman. The Power of Experiments: Decision-Making in a Data-Driven World. MIT Press, 2020.
- Bazerman, Max. The Power of Noticing: What the Best Leaders See. New York: Simon & Schuster, 2014.
- Bazerman, Max, and Don A. Moore. Judgment in Managerial Decision Making. 8th ed. John Wiley & Sons, 2013.
- Bazerman, Max H., and Ann E. Tenbrunsel. Blind Spots: Why We Fail to Do What's Right and What to Do about It. Princeton University Press, 2011.
- Kramer, Roderick M., Ann E. Tenbrunsel and Max H. Bazerman, eds. Social Decision Making: Social Dilemmas, Social Values, and Ethical Judgments. New York: Routledge, 2009.
- Bazerman, Max, ed. Quanto Sei (a)Morale?: Leadership Etica E Psicologia Della Decisione. Sole 24 ore S.p.A., 2009.
- Bazerman, Max, and Michael D. Watkins. Predictable Surprises. Paperback ed. Harvard Business School Press, 2008.
- Malhotra, Deepak, and M. H. Bazerman. Negotiation Genius. Bantam Books, 2007.
- Moore, D., G. Loewenstein, D. Cain and M. H. Bazerman, eds. Conflicts of Interest. Cambridge University Press, 2005
- Bazerman, Max. Judgment in Managerial Decision Making. 6th ed. John Wiley & Sons, 2005.
- Bazerman, M. H., ed. Negotiation, Decision Making, and Conflict Management. 3 vols. Edward Elgar Publishing, 2005.
- Bazerman, M. H., and M. Watkins. Predictable Surprises. Boston: Harvard Business School Press, 2004.
- Bazerman, M. H., Jonathan Baron, and Katherine Shonk. You Can't Enlarge the Pie: Six Barriers to Effective Government. New York: Basic Books, 2001.
- Bazerman, M. H. Smart Money Decisions. John Wiley & Sons, 1999.
- Bazerman, M. H., D. M. Messick, A. E. Tenbrunsel and K. A. Wade-Benzoni, eds. Environment, Ethics, and Behavior: The Psychology of Environmental Valuation and Degradation. San Francisco: New Lexington Press, 1997.
- Bazerman, M. H., and M. A. Neale. Negotiating Rationally. Free Press, 1992.
- Neale, M. A., and M. H. Bazerman. Cognition and Rationality in Negotiation. Free Press, 1991.
- Bazerman, M. H., R. J. Lewicki and B. H. Sheppard, eds. Handbook of Negotiation Research. Vol. 3, Research on Negotiation in Organizations. JAI Press, 1991.
- Sheppard, B. H., M. H. Bazerman and R. J. Lewicki, eds. Research on Negotiation in Organizations: A Series of Analytical Essays and Critical Reviews. Vol. 3. JAI Press, 1990.
- Bazerman, M. H. and R.J. Lewicki, eds. Negotiating in Organizations. Sage Publications, 1983.
