= Peter Suedfeld =

Hungarian-Canadian psychologist (born 1935)

Peter Suedfeld OC FRSC
- Born: August 30, 1935 (age 91); Budapest, Hungary
- Education: Queens College of the City University of New York; Princeton University
- Children: 2
- Scientific career
- Fields: Psychology
- Workplaces: University of Illinois; Rutgers University; University of British Columbia
- Notable students: Philip E. Tetlock
- Website: www2.psych.ubc.ca/~psuedfeld/

Peter Suedfeld (born August 30, 1935) is a Hungarian-Canadian professor emeritus of psychology at the University of British Columbia.

Suedfeld is a researcher in the field of Restricted Environmental Stimulation Therapy (REST), and was the founding President of IRIS (the International REST Investigators Society). His archival and field research studied the reactions and adaptation of crews in the Antarctic, the Canadian High Arctic, and space vehicles. The findings were among the earliest to emphasize the positive and negative aspects of these experiences. He urged space agencies to consider new methods for enhancing astronauts’ psychological well-being, rather than focusing on treating adverse effects.

== Biography ==
Peter Suedfeld was born in Budapest, Hungary to Jewish parents who died in the concentration camp at Auschwitz. The young Suedfeld escaped with the help of the International Red Cross and immigrated to the United States after World War II. After three years of service in the United States Army, he received his BA from Queens College of the City University of New York in 1960, and his MA and PhD in experimental psychology from Princeton University in 1963. He taught at the University of Illinois and Rutgers University prior to joining the University of British Columbia in 1972 as head of the Department of Psychology. He later became Dean of the Faculty of Graduate Studies, and now holds emeritus status.

Suedfeld is a Fellow of the Royal Society of Canada (the National Academy), the Canadian Psychological Association, the American Psychological Association (6 Divisions), and the Academy of Behavioral Medicine Research. He is a full member of the International Academy of Astronautics, a Fellow International of the Explorers Club, and the only psychologist elected as an Honorary Fellow of the Royal Canadian Geographical Society. He has received the Canadian Psychological Society's Donald O. Hebb Award, its highest award for distinguished scientific contributions, as well as the Society's gold medal for distinguished and enduring lifetime contributions to Canadian psychology and its Award for Distinguished Contributions to the International Advancement of Psychology. Other awards include the Canadian Polar Medal, Queen Elizabeth II's Diamond Jubilee Medal, the highest award for scientific contributions from the International Society of Political Psychology, the Antarctica Service Medal of the U.S. National Science Foundation, and the Zachor Award of the Parliament of Canada for contributions by Holocaust survivors to Canadian society. He has chaired the Canadian Antarctic Research Program and the Life Sciences Advisory Committee of the Canadian Space Agency. He continues his research and organizational activities at the University of British Columbia in Vancouver, British Columbia. In 2019 Suedfeld was admitted to the Order of Canada.

== Research ==
His research, published in seven books and over 300 book chapters and journal articles, has focused on the strengths of people as they cope during and after experiencing extreme, unusual, challenging, and traumatic events and environments. His methodology has included laboratory experiments in profound stimulus reduction, fieldwork in the Antarctic and the High Arctic, and interview and questionnaire studies with Holocaust survivors, prisoners in solitary confinement, and astronauts. More recently, he has been developing and applying methods of quantitative content analysis to archival material produced by individuals in those groups, as well as solitary sailors, early explorers, mountain climbers, and high-level political and military leaders in situations of personal, national, and international stress.

His work in the area of political psychology is largely based on the quantitative analysis of archival materials. The research has demonstrated that changes in integrative complexity can be used to forecast the outcome of international crises (peaceful negotiation or war) as well as individual successes and that political leaders tend to be effective “cognitive managers” who direct resources as important problems need to be solved.

He has also engaged in a series of studies on survivors of genocide and persecution. His major findings indicate that contrary to professional prognoses and despite some long-lasting adverse consequences, Holocaust and other survivors generally do not suffer from full-blown post traumatic stress disorder, and lead productive, successful, and satisfying lives within circles of families, friends, and colleagues.

The overall theme of his work is summarized in his seminal paper, “Homo Invictus: The Indomitable Species.”
