= National Strategic Computing Initiative =

American computer project

The National Strategic Computing Initiative (NSCI) is a United States initiative calling for the accelerated development of technologies for exascale supercomputers, and funding research into post-semiconductor computing. The initiative was created by an executive order issued by President Barack Obama in July 2015. Ten United States government departments and independent agencies are involved in the initiative. The initiative initially brought together existing programs, with some dedicated funding increases proposed in the Obama administration's 2017 budget request. The initiative's strategic plan was released in July 2016.

== Themes ==
The program has five strategic themes:

- To unite the traditional high-performance computing (HPC) focus on physical simulations for scientific research and engineering, which focuses on increasing the computing speed, with "big data" applications that are optimized for working with large amounts of data
- To preserve the United States' dominance and leadership role in HPC in the face of advances by other nations, by supporting users, vendor companies, software developers, and researchers
- To improve the interoperability of software between different supercomputers, reducing the need to laboriously optimize programs in the context of specific machines
- To provide widespread access to and training for HPC resources to public and private sector researchers, including through remote access
- To develop post-silicon technologies for alternative computing to support future improvements in hardware

At an April 2016 forum, engaging independent software vendors to develop software platforms for HPC was seen as a major hurdle of the initiative, as was attracting a workforce to work on HPC given the dominance of startup companies in attracting talent, and raising awareness of government HPC resources to outside parties.

Justifications for the initiative include the increasing capabilities of China in supercomputing, as well as the increasing relevance of HPC to industry rather than only academic applications.

== Agencies ==
There are three lead agencies: the Department of Energy and Department of Defense will jointly focus on advanced simulation, with Defense also focusing on data analysis, while the National Science Foundation will focus on scientific discovery and workforce development. Energy's involvement will be through the Office of Science and the National Nuclear Security Administration. The FY2017 budget proposal envisions the preexisting Exascale Computing Initiative continuing to deal with research and development for exascale computing, but a new Exascale Computing Program would assume responsibility for development and procurement of actual machines, along the lines of Energy's other scientific instruments such as the Advanced Photon Source the Spallation Neutron Source. The National Science Foundation's involvement would mainly be centered in its Advanced Cyberinfrastructure program, although the Mathematical and Physical Sciences Directorate would co-lead.

There are two foundational research and development agencies: the Intelligence Advanced Research Projects Activity (IARPA) will focus on alternative post-silicon computing paradigms, while the National Institute of Standards and Technology (NIST) will focus on measurement science needed for future computing technologies. IARPA's programs in superconducting computing are aligned with the initiative.

The five deployment agencies, which will be involved in design and testing for projects related to their missions, are NASA, Federal Bureau of Investigation, National Institutes of Health, Department of Homeland Security, and National Oceanic and Atmospheric Administration (NOAA). While NASA and NOAA already have high-performance computing programs, those at the other three deployment agencies would be new.

== History ==
The initiative was created by Executive Order 13702, signed by President Barack Obama on July 29, 2015. The initiative had been under development since 2012. The July 2015 executive order formally establishing the program was seen as the result of deadlock and opposition in Congress to the Obama administration's fiscal year 2016 budget request. As part of the initiative, a request for information on "Science Drivers Requiring Capable Exascale High Performance Computing" was issued by the National Science Foundation on September 15, 2015. The initiative's Implementation Plan was issued on October 27, 2015, although it was not immediately released to the public to avoid preempting higher-level budgetary planning.

Although the Obama administration's fiscal year 2017 budget request, released in February 2016, included $285 million for the Department of Energy and $33 million for the National Science Foundation through the NSCI, few additional details about the initiative had emerged in the following months. Although there was concern that the initiative might not survive the upcoming elections and change of presidential administration, Office of Science and Technology Policy director John Holdren in May 2016 expressed confidence that it would survive into the next administration regardless of who the next President would be.

The strategic plan was released in July 2016, on the first anniversary of the initiative. It was reported that the perceived delay in implementation was due to its expansiveness across many government agencies and that it was during a contentious election year. Workforce development was cited as a particularly thorny issue during a July 2016 NSCI workshop in Washington, D.C. At the time the initiative was criticized for bringing existing programs, such as the Cancer Breakthroughs 2020, under a new umbrella initiative rather than starting new programs. In late 2016, the first exascale systems were expected to be operational by 2022.

== See also ==
- Strategic Computing Initiative
- Advanced Simulation and Computing Program
- Precision Medicine Initiative
- Networking and Information Technology Research and Development
