= Blender (magazine) =

Former American music magazine

- Issue 2.1 from 1995, featuring Björk
- Editor-in-Chief: Dale Hrabi
- Former editors: Regina Joseph (Founding Editor-in-Chief), Howard Stringer
- Categories: Music
- Frequency: 10 times per year
- Founded: 1994
- First issue: August 1994 (CD-ROM); June–July 2001 (Print)
- Final issue: June 1997 (CD-ROM); April 2009 (Print)
- Company: Dennis Publishing
- Country: United States
- Based in: New York
- Language: English
- Website: Blender.com
- ISSN: 1534-0554
- OCLC: 34610465

Blender was an American music magazine published from 1994 to 2009 that billed itself as "the ultimate guide to pop culture". It was also known for sometimes steamy pictorials of celebrities. It compiled lists of albums, artists, and songs, including both "best of" and "worst of" lists. In each issue, there was a review of an artist's entire discography, with each album being analyzed in turn.

Blender was published by Dennis Publishing. The magazine was created by founding Editor-in-Chief Regina Joseph as the first digital magazine, delivered entirely on CD-ROM disc and before the development of graphical browsers required to view the web. She brought in co-founders Jason Pearson and David Cherry, and Blender's original publisher, Felix Dennis/Dennis Publishing, UK. Joseph's CD-ROM editions of Blender also featured the first forms of digital advertising. Felix Dennis published 15 digital CD issues, and launched a web version in 1996. The final CD-ROM issue was published in June 1997, issue 14. Dennis started publishing a print edition again in June 2001, which became the final distribution format of the title. Blender CD-ROM showcased the earliest digital editorial formats, as well as the first forms of digital advertising. The first digital advertisers included SonicNet, Time-Life/Philips, Calvin Klein, Apple Computer, Toyota and Nike.

In June 2006, the Chicago Tribune placed Blender eighth in a list of the 50 best magazines, describing it as "the cool kid at the school of rock magazines".

In 2007, Dennis Publishing was bought by the Quadrangle Group, who created a new subsidiary called the Alpha Media Group. The latter decided to close Blender March 26, 2009, going to an online-only format in a move that eliminated 30 jobs and reduced the company's portfolio of titles to Maxim alone. Blender's final print issue was the April 2009 issue. Subscribers to the magazine were sent issues of Maxim magazine to make up for the unsent Blender issues.

== Indian edition ==
Blender India
- Priyanka Chopra on the November 2008 cover of the Indian edition of Blender
- Editor in Chief: Sam Lal
- Categories: Music
- Publisher: Piyush Sharma
- First issue: May 2008
- Company: Dennis Media Transasia India
- Country: India
- Based in: New Delhi
- Language: English

The Indian edition of Blender was the title's first venture outside the United States. It commenced publication with its May 2008 issue, which featured Mariah Carey on the cover. The magazine was targeted at educated male city dwellers aged between 18 and 34. The magazine was launched through Dennis Media Transasia India, a joint venture between Dennis Publishing and Media Transasia, which also publishes the Asian versions of Blender and Maxim. The joint venture was based in New Delhi with offices in Bangalore, Chennai, Kolkata and Mumbai.
