= MICrONS =

Research project conducted by the US

- Commercial?: No
- Type of project: Academic; Scientific (neuroscience)
- Location: United States
- Owner: IARPA
- Established: 2016
- Funding: United States government, US$100 million
- Website: www.iarpa.gov/index.php/research-programs/microns

The MICrONS program (Machine Intelligence from Cortical Networks) is a five-year project primarily funded by the United States government through the Intelligence Advanced Research Projects Activity (IARPA) with the goal of constructing a connectome of one cubic millimeter of a rodent's brain tissue—spanning many petabytes of volumetric data comprising around 120,000 neurons—and reverse engineering the circuits with the goal of advancing neuroscience and improving algorithms in machine learning and artificial intelligence. The tissue volume is a 1.4mm x 0.87mm x 0.84mm section containing multiple areas of mouse visual cortex. The MICrONS dataset is a multi-modal dataset containing the structural connectome of the entire volume, collected using transmission electron microscopy (TEM), and functional recordings of an estimated 75,000 excitatory neurons using two-photon calcium imaging. The program was part of the White House BRAIN Initiative.

== Teams ==
The program has set up three independent teams, each of which will take a different approach towards the goal. The teams are led by David Cox of Harvard University, Tai Sing Lee of Carnegie Mellon University; and jointly by Andreas Tolias and Xaq Pitkow of the Baylor College of Medicine, Clay Reid of the Allen Institute for Brain Science, and Sebastian Seung of Princeton University.

The Cox team aimed to build a three-dimensional map of the neural connections within the source tissue block using reconstructions from electron micrographs.

Technology and infrastructure for storing petabyte-scale volumetric data, including a cloud-based database, bossDB, were developed by the Johns Hopkins Applied Physics Lab.

== Approach ==
The part of the brain chosen for the project is part of the visual cortex, chosen as a representative of a task – visual perception – that is easy for animals and human beings to perform, but has turned out to be extremely difficult to emulate with computers.

Cox's team attempted to build a three dimensional mapping of the actual neural connections, based on fine electron micrographs. Lee's team took a DNA barcoding approach, in attempt to map the brain circuits by barcode-labelling of each neuron, and cross-synapse barcode connections.

Tolias's team took a data-driven approach, assuming the brain creates statistical expectations about the world it sees. They used multiphoton microscopy to record activity of nearly every neuron in the cubic millimeter of visual cortex in response to diverse and rich visual stimuli. Data aggregation, processing, and analysis were performed using the DataJoint framework.

== Results ==
The primary data has been collected, processed, and submitted for publication:

- Bae, J. Alexander; et al. (2025). "Functional connectomics spanning multiple areas of mouse visual cortex". Nature. 640 (8058): 435–447. bioRxiv 10.1101/2021.07.28.454025. doi:10.1038/s41586-025-08790-w. PMC 11981939. PMID 40205214.

This data is available as a public resource.
