= Steven Nixon =

Steven Nixon (born October 11, 1965) is founder and president of Steven Nixon Consulting, former Chief Technology Officer (CTO) and Director of Science and Technology of the United States Intelligence Community, former first Acting Director of the Intelligence Advanced Research Projects Activity (IARPA), a former professional staff member with the United States House Appropriations Committee, and a former senior civilian analyst at the Pentagon.

Nixon is generally credited with spearheading the creation of IARPA and the Rapid Technology Transition Initiative (RTTI). He has also had significant influence over US defense and intelligence space programs.

== Awards/Recognitions ==
- National Intelligence Medal of Achievement, 2008.
- In 2008, the National Academy of Engineering identified Nixon as one of the nation's outstanding engineers.
- In 2005, Nixon was selected by the National Journal as one of the most influential staffers in Congress.
- In 2005 Space News identified Nixon as one of the "Top 10 Who Made a Difference in Space" alongside the director of the NASA and the director of the European Space Agency, as well as other leaders in commercial, military, and government space sectors.
