= Aggregative Contingent Estimation Program =

U.S. government research program

Aggregative Contingent Estimation (ACE) was a program of the Office of Incisive Analysis (OIA) at the Intelligence Advanced Research Projects Activity (IARPA). The program ran from June 2010 until June 2015.

== History ==
The broad program announcement for ACE was published on June 30, 2010. ACE funded the Aggregative Contingent Estimation System (ACES) website and interface on July 15, 2011. They funded The Good Judgment Project some time around July 2011. ACE has been covered in The Washington Post'' and Wired Magazine. The program was concluded by late 2015. The program manager was future IARPA director Jason Gaverick Matheny.

== Goals and methods ==
The official website says that the goals of ACE are "to dramatically enhance the accuracy, precision, and timeliness of intelligence forecasts for a broad range of event types, through the development of advanced techniques that elicit, weight, and combine the judgments of many intelligence analysts." The website claims that ACE seeks technical innovations in the following areas:

- efficient elicitation of probabilistic judgments, including conditional probabilities for contingent events
- mathematical aggregation of judgments by many individuals, based on factors that may include: past performance, expertise, cognitive style, metaknowledge, and other attributes predictive of accuracy
- effective representation of aggregated probabilistic forecasts and their distributions.

There is a fair amount of research funded by grants made by the IARPA ACE program.

== Partners ==
The ACE has collaborated with partners who compete in its forecasting tournaments. Their most notable partner is The Good Judgment Project from Philip E. Tetlock et al. (winner of a 2013 ACE tournament) ACE also partnered with the ARA to create the Aggregative Contingent Estimation System (ACES).

Data from ACE is fed into another program, called Forecasting Science and Technology (ForeST), which partners with SciCast from George Mason University.
