= Linda Skitka =

Psychologist

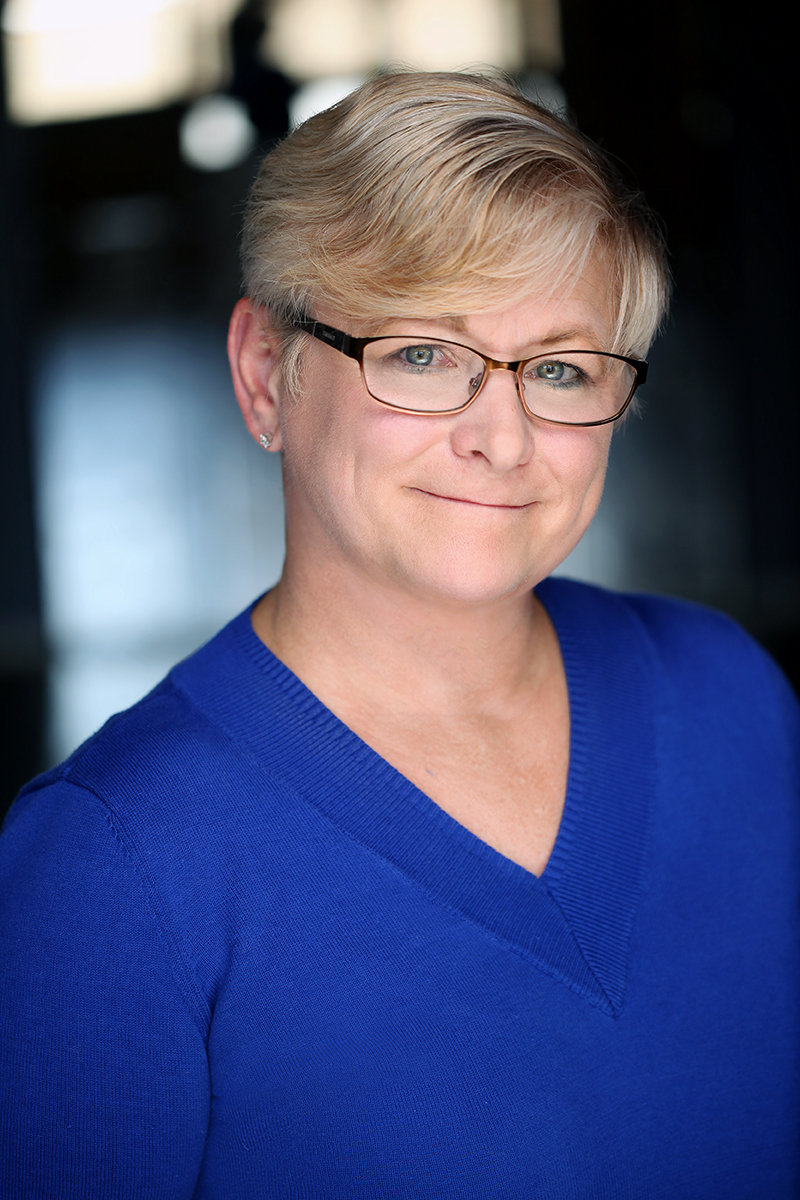
- Education: University of Michigan; University of California, Berkeley
- Scientific career
- Fields: Psychology
- Workplaces: University of Illinois Chicago

Linda J. Skitka is Distinguished Professor Emerita of Psychology at the University of Illinois Chicago. Skitka's research bridges a number of areas of inquiry including social, political, and moral psychology.

== Publications ==
She has authored or co-authored papers for the Journal of Personality and Social Psychology, Personality and Social Psychology Bulletin, Journal of Experimental Social Psychology, Social Justice Research, and Political Psychology. She is best known for her research into justice and fairness, moral conviction, and political reasoning.

A recent and highly-cited collaborative publication she provided research towards gave major insight into psychological responses to the pandemic, titled Using social and behavioural science to support COVID-19 pandemic response. It focuses on how to encourage behavior change in the public, manage the psychological effects of the pandemic, and promote effective communication and leadership during this period.

== Affiliations and recognition ==
She is the current president of the Midwestern Psychological Association, the president-elect for the Society for Personality and Social Psychology, served as president of the International Society for Justice Research from 2006 to 2008, served on the executive committee for the Society for Experimental Social Psychology, and was the founding chairperson of a consortium of professional societies that collaborated to launch the scholarly journal Social Psychological and Personality Science. Skitka is also on numerous editorial boards for academic journals, has received research funding from National Aeronautics and Space Administration (NASA), the National Science Foundation (NSF), and the Templeton Foundation, and has won several awards for excellence in teaching, mentoring, service and research.

== See also ==
- Automation bias – Propensity for humans to favor suggestions from automated decision-making systems
