= Expert Political Judgment =

Expert Political Judgment: How Good Is It? How Can We Know?
- First edition
- Author: Philip E. Tetlock
- Language: English
- Genre: Non-fiction
- Publisher: Princeton University Press
- Publication date: 2005
- Publication place: United States

Expert Political Judgment: How Good Is It? How Can We Know? is a 2005 book by Philip E. Tetlock. The book mentions how experts are often no better at making predictions than most other people, and how when they are wrong, they are rarely held accountable.
