= Jennifer Lerner =

American psychologist

Jennifer S. Lerner is an American experimental social psychologist known for her research in emotion and decision theory. She is the first psychologist at the Harvard Kennedy School to receive tenure. At Harvard, her titles include Professor of Public Policy and Management, Professor of Psychology (by courtesy appointment), Faculty Director in the Graduate Commons Program, co-founder of the Harvard Decision Science Laboratory and co-director of the Harvard Faculty Group on Emotion, Decision Making, and Health. Her research interests include the effects of accountability on judgment and choice. She founded and directs the Leadership Decision Making program within Harvard Kennedy School's executive education program. In 2018 Jennifer S. Lerner took leave from Harvard duties to become the first Navy's Chief Decision Scientist.

Lerner was diagnosed with Systemic Lupus Erythematosus at the age of 16. She is an advocate for people with disabilities, particularly children with chronic disease.

== Education ==
Lerner received her B.A. in psychology from the University of Michigan Honors College in 1990. She received her M.A and Ph.D. in psychology from the University of California, Berkeley in 1994 and 1998, respectively. Her postdoctoral fellowship through a National Institutes of Health National Research Service Award (NRSA) took place at UCLA and focused on biological bases of emotion. From 1999 to 2007 she served on the faculty of the Department of Social and Decision Sciences at Carnegie Mellon University. Her primary PhD advisors were Dacher Keltner, Philip E. Tetlock and Shelley Taylor. She also received an Honorary M.A. Degree from Harvard University in 2007.

== Work in psychology ==
Lerner's research focuses on the influence of specific emotions (e.g., happiness or anger), in contrast to most models, which focus on larger categories of emotions (e.g., positive moods or negative moods) on behavior and decision making. She has proposed a framework which predicts that the influence of a specific emotion on judgment depends on a variety of cognitive factors related to the source of each emotion. This is a theory that speculates that an individuals cognition and emotion effects their reactions and judgement over a scenario. Currently she is working to test predictions from this framework. For example, in a series of studies, her research examines the distinct effects of fear, anger, and happiness on risk perception and risk preference.

== Life ==
Lerner currently resides in the Boston area with her husband where they parent a grown daughter and dog.

== Honors and awards ==
Lerner was awarded the Presidential Early Career Award for Scientists and Engineers (PECASE) at a White House ceremony. She furthermore was denoted as part of the "Sensational 60" which was defined as the top 60 most prominent scientists in America who received their first grants from NSF graduate school fellowships.

- Radcliffe Institute Fellow, 2010–2011
- Presidential Early Career Award for Scientists and Engineers (PECASE), awarded by the National Science Foundation and The President of the United States, 2004
- Estella Loomis McCandless Endowed (Junior) Chair, Carnegie Mellon, 2004–2007
- The National Science Foundation CAREER Award 2003-2008
- National Research Service Award, The National Institute of Mental Health, 1998–1999
- The National Science Foundation Graduate Fellowship, 1993–1996
- Highest Honors in Psychology, University of Michigan, 1990
- James B. Angell Scholar, University of Michigan, 1989–1990
