= Intelligence Advanced Research Projects Activity =

American government agency

Agency overview
- Formed: 2006
- Jurisdiction: United States Government
- Headquarters: Intelligence Community Campus-Bethesda
- Agency executive: Dr. Richard "Rick" Muller, Director
- Parent agency: Office of the Director of National Intelligence
- Website: IARPA.gov

The Intelligence Advanced Research Projects Activity (IARPA) is an organization, within the Office of the Director of National Intelligence (ODNI), that is responsible for leading research to overcome difficult challenges facing the United States Intelligence Community. IARPA characterizes its mission as follows: "To envision and lead high-risk, high-payoff research that delivers innovative technology for future overwhelming intelligence advantage."

IARPA funds academic and industry research across a broad range of technical areas, including mathematics, computer science, physics, chemistry, biology, neuroscience, linguistics, political science, and cognitive psychology. Most IARPA research is unclassified and openly published. IARPA transfers successful research results and technologies to other government agencies. Notable IARPA investments include quantum computing, superconducting computing, machine learning, and forecasting tournaments.

== Mission ==
IARPA characterizes its mission as "to envision and lead high-risk, high-payoff research that delivers innovative technology for future overwhelming intelligence advantage".

== History ==
In 1958, the first Advanced Research Projects Agency, or ARPA, was created in response to an unanticipated surprise—the Soviet Union's successful launch of Sputnik on October 4, 1957. The ARPA model was designed to anticipate and pre-empt such technological surprises. As then-Secretary of Defense Neil McElroy said, "I want an agency that makes sure no important thing remains undone because it doesn't fit somebody's mission." The ARPA model has been characterized by ambitious technical goals, competitively awarded research led by term-limited staff, and independent testing and evaluation.

Authorized by the ODNI in 2006, IARPA was modeled after DARPA but focused on national intelligence, rather than military, needs. The agency was formed from a consolidation of the National Security Agency's Disruptive Technology Office, the National Geospatial-Intelligence Agency's National Technology Alliance, and the Central Intelligence Agency's Intelligence Technology Innovation Center. IARPA operations began on October 1, 2007 with Lisa Porter as founding director. Its headquarters, a new building in M Square, the University of Maryland's research park in Riverdale Park, Maryland, was dedicated in April 2009.

In 2010, IARPA's quantum computing research was named Science magazine's Breakthrough of the Year. In 2015, IARPA was named to lead foundational research and development for the National Strategic Computing Initiative. IARPA is also a part of other White House science and technology efforts, including the U.S. BRAIN Initiative, and the nanotechnology-inspired Grand Challenge for Future Computing. In 2013, The New York Times's op-ed columnist David Brooks called IARPA "one of the government's most creative agencies."

== Approach ==
IARPA invests in multi-year research programs, in which academic and industry teams compete to solve a well-defined set of technical problems, regularly scored on a shared set of metrics and milestones. Each program is led by an IARPA Program Manager (PM) who is a term-limited Government employee. IARPA programs are meant to enable researchers to pursue ideas that are potentially disruptive to the status quo.

Most IARPA research is unclassified and openly published. Former director Jason Matheny has stated that the agency's goals of openness and external engagement serve to draw in expertise from academia and industry, or even individuals who "might be working in their basement on some data-science project and might have an idea for how to solve an important problem". IARPA transfers successful research results and technologies to other government agencies.

== Research fields ==
IARPA is known for its programs to fund research into anticipatory intelligence, using data science to make predictions about future events ranging from political elections to disease outbreaks to cyberattacks, some of which focus on open-source intelligence. IARPA has pursued these objectives not only through traditional funding programs but also through tournaments and prizes. Aggregative Contingent Estimation (ACE) is an example of one such program. Other projects involve the analysis of images or videos that lack metadata by directly analyzing the media's content itself. Examples given by IARPA include determining the location of an image by analyzing features such as the placement of trees or a mountain skyline, or determining whether a video is of a baseball game or a traffic jam. Another program focuses on developing speech recognition tools that can transcribe arbitrary languages.

IARPA is also involved in high-performance computing and alternative computing methods. In 2015, IARPA was named one of two foundational research and development agencies in the National Strategic Computing Initiative, with the specific charge of finding "future computing paradigms offering an alternative to standard semiconductor computing technologies". One such approach is cryogenic superconducting computing, which seeks to use superconductors such as niobium, rather than semiconductors, to reduce the energy consumption of future exascale supercomputers.

Several programs at IARPA focus on quantum computing and neuroscience. IARPA is a major funder of quantum computing research, due to its applications in quantum cryptography. As of 2009, IARPA was said to provide a large portion of quantum computing funding resources in the United States. Quantum computing research funded by IARPA was named Science Magazine's Breakthrough of the Year in 2010, and physicist David Wineland was a winner of the 2012 Nobel Prize in Physics for quantum computing research funded by IARPA. IARPA is also involved in neuromorphic computation efforts as part of the U.S. BRAIN Initiative and the National Nanotechnology Initiative's Grand Challenge for Future Computing. IARPA's MICrONS project seeks to reverse engineer one cubic millimeter of brain tissue and use insights from its study to improve machine learning and artificial intelligence.

== Research programs ==
Below are some of the past and current research programs of IARPA.

=== Past research ===
- Aggregative Contingent Estimation (ACE) Program aimed "to dramatically enhance the accuracy, precision, and timeliness of intelligence forecasts for a broad range of event types, through the development of advanced techniques that elicit, weight, and combine the judgments of many intelligence analysts."
- ATHENA Program was a research program about cybersecurity. It aimed "to provide an early warning system for detecting precursors to cyberattacks".
- Babel Program developed "agile and robust speech recognition technology that can be rapidly applied to any human language in order to provide effective search capability for analysts to efficiently process massive amounts of real-world recorded speech". The program tried to develop software that could transcribe and search among all the languages.
- Biometrics Exploitation Science & Technology (BEST) Program focused on trying to "significantly advance the state-of-the-science for biometrics technologies". It was to discover techniques on utilizing biometrics from a subject in a less controlled environment which could produce a similar result to that in a controlled environment.
- Synthetic Holographic Observation (SHO) Program's stated goal was "to enable full-parallax, full-color, high-resolution display of dynamic 3D data without head-gear, and possessing visually continuous perspectives without artifacts over wide viewing angles."

=== Current research ===
- Creation of Operationally Realistic 3-D Environments (CORE3D) aims to "develop rapid automated systems for 3-D models which are designed with complex physical properties and automated methods that will pull commercial, satellite, and airborne imagery."
- Crowdsourcing Evidence, Argumentation, Thinking and Evaluation (CREATE) Program is about "to develop, and experimentally test, systems that use crowdsourcing and structured analytic techniques to improve analytic reasoning". It hopes to improve the intelligence community's ability to better understand evidence and sources in order to produce accurate information.
- Deep Intermodal Video Analytics (DIVA) aims to "advance state-of-the-art artificial visual perception, and automate video monitoring."
- Functional Genomic and Computational Assessment of Threats (Fun GCAT) aims to "develop next-generation biological data tools to improve DNA sequence screening, augment biodefense capabilities through the characterization of threats, and advance our understanding of the relative risks posed by unknown sequences."
- Hybrid Forecasting Competition (HFC) aims to "improve accuracy in predicting worldwide geopolitical issues, including foreign political elections, interstate conflict, disease outbreaks, and economic indicators by leveraging the relative strengths of humans and machines."
- Machine Translation for English Retrieval of Information in Any Language (MATERIAL) aims to "develop and deploy fully automatic systems that will allow English-only speakers to accurately and efficiently identify foreign language documents of interest."
- Molecular Analyzer for Efficient Gas-phase Low-power Interrogation (MAEGLIN) aims to "develop a compact system capable of unattended environmental sampling and chemical identification with minimal (preferably no) consumables."
- Multimodal Objective Sensing to Assess Individuals with Context (MOSAIC) Program aims to develop "unobtrusive, passive, and persistent measurement to predict an individual’s job performance". It designs and tests sensors that can collect data about monitoring employees' work performance.
- Rapid Analysis of Various Emerging Nano-electronics (RAVEN) aims to "develop tools to rapidly image current and future integrated circuit chips."
- Space-based Machine Automated Recognition Technique (SMART) program.

== Directors ==
- Steven Nixon (acting, 2007)
- Tim Murphy (acting, 2007–2008)
- Lisa Porter (2008–2012)
- Peter Highnam (2012–2015)
- Jason Matheny (2015–2018)
- Stacey Dixon (2018–2019)
- Catherine Marsh (2019–April 2024)
- Dr. Richard "Rick" Muller (April 2024–December 2025)
- Russell Miller (December 2025-Present)

== See also ==
- Defense Advanced Research Projects Agency (DARPA)
- Advanced Research Projects Agency–Energy (ARPA-E)
- Homeland Security Advanced Research Projects Agency (HSARPA)
- Advanced Research Projects Agency for Health (ARPA-H)
- Advanced Research Projects Agency–Infrastructure (ARPA-I)
