= The Elephant in the Brain =

2018 book by Kevin Simler and Robin Hanson

The Elephant in the Brain: Hidden Motives in Everyday Life
- First edition
- Authors: Kevin Simler and Robin Hanson
- Language: English
- Subjects: Human behaviour, signalling (economics)
- Publisher: Oxford University Press
- Publication date: 2018
- Pages: 416
- ISBN: 9780190495992
- Preceded by: The Age of Em

The Elephant in the Brain: Hidden Motives in Everyday Life is a 2018 nonfiction book by Kevin Simler and Robin Hanson. Simler is a writer and software engineer, while Hanson is an associate professor of economics at George Mason University. The book explores self-deception and hidden motives in human behaviour. The publisher's website describes the aim of the book as 'to track down the darker, unexamined corners of our psyches and blast them with floodlights'.

== Summary ==
The main thesis of the book is that we are very often not aware of our real reasons for most of our behaviours. Our behaviors are optimised for living in a social group and very often, from the point of view of natural selection, it is useful if we are not consciously aware of our real motivations.

The book is split into two sections. The first, entitled 'Why We Hide Our Motives', includes an introduction to the subjects of animal behaviour, signalling, social norms and self-deception. In the second section, entitled 'Hidden Motives in Everyday Life', each chapter covers an aspect of human behaviour and describes how it can be explained through the framework of signalling and self-deception outlined in the first section. The chapters in this section cover body language, laughter, conversation, consumption, art, charity, education, medicine, religion and politics.

=== Body language ===
In this chapter, the authors claim that body language is largely a way of communicating status. Most of us will not consciously describe our body language as doing this; nonetheless, various status-related body positions can be observed in humans, similar to other primates.

=== Laughter ===
The authors argue that laughter is not just a response to humour, but is better thought of as a 'play signal' - an indication that we do not have feelings of hostility towards the other party. A wide range of data is used to support this hypothesis including the fact that people laugh more in groups than on their own, the fact that babies laugh more with their mothers, and the fact that a person who is speaking in general laughs more than a person who is listening.

=== Conversation ===
Conversation is often thought of as a means of exchanging information. However, most conversations do not involve the exchange of useful information, and the structure of conversation is often not optimised for this exchange. The authors argue that this is because a major purpose of conversation is instead to show off our mental ability.

=== Consumption ===
The authors discuss Thorstein Veblen's theory of conspicuous consumption. This is the idea that, though we may claim that we buy goods for practical purposes, the main purpose of buying many goods is to signal to others that we can afford to buy them. The authors then point out that many other things, apart from wealth, can be signaled through consumption.

=== Art ===
The authors point out that how much we value art largely depends on extrinsic features of the art, such as whether or not it is original and whether it is hand-made or machine-manufactured. This does not make sense if one claims that one cares about art for its intrinsic content. Art is better thought of as a way for people to show off their erudition and discernment as well as to associate themselves with artists.

=== Charity ===
The authors point out that, while most people claim and feel that they give money to charity because they wish to help a cause, very few people bother to check the cost-effectiveness of the charities which they donate to. The authors argue that this behaviour cannot be explained by the desire to help the cause, but can be explained if donations to charity are viewed as a way of signalling wealth, generosity and compassion.

=== Education ===
This section makes broadly the same argument as Bryan Caplan's book The Case Against Education. Most of us claim that the point of education is to learn the taught material. However, employers often require employees to have a degree, even if the degree is unrelated to the job and most students forget a lot of what they have learnt after a few years out of education. The authors argue that the main purpose of education is to show off intelligence, conscientiousness and conformity, as well as achieving secondary purposes, such as allowing people to socialize and allowing the government to indoctrinate its citizens.

=== Medicine ===
The story we tell ourselves about medicine and healthcare is that we use it in order to get better when we are unwell. However, this story does not fit in with many facts about healthcare. For example, regions which spend more on medicine do not tend to be healthier, and when people are given access to cheaper healthcare, they do not become healthier (for example in the RAND Health Insurance Experiment). Simler and Hanson argue that this is because medicine and healthcare are largely about signalling compassion, rather than promoting health.

=== Religion ===
Most religious people will claim that they are religious because they hold certain beliefs. Simler and Hanson argue that for most of history, religion has been about enacting certain behaviours, rather than specific beliefs. They also point out that religious people (of many conflicting religions) tend to have better physical and mental health than non-religious people. They suggest that the main purpose of religion is to provide a sense of community, and that the rituals and sacrifices that people make for their religions are ways of signalling loyalty.

=== Politics ===
On the face of it, the reason that people participate in politics is to improve the world in some way. However, most of us engage in politics in a way which is emotional, poorly informed relative to the strength of claims that we make, and we are generally unwilling to compromise on political issues. These facts are better explained if politics is a way of signalling affiliation to a 'tribe' of like-minded people than as a way of actually trying to improve the world.

== Reception ==
Writing in The Wall Street Journal, Matthew Hutson called the book 'refreshingly frank' and 'penetrating'.

In a mostly negative review for The New Yorker, journalist and novelist John Lanchester praised the section on education, but criticized the book for 'taking an argument that has worthwhile applications and extending it further than it usefully goes'. He also claimed that the emphasis on hidden motives undermined human achievements generated by those motives, such as 'writing symphonies, curing diseases, building cathedrals, searching into the deepest mysteries of time and space and so on'. Hanson responded to these criticisms on his blog.

A review for Publishers Weekly called the book a 'fascinating and accessible introduction to an important subject'

In the New York Intelligencer, Park MacDougald gave the book a mixed review calling it 'interesting, occasionally enlightening, and sometimes a little slapdash'. MacDougald particularly criticized the book's reliance on social psychology research in light of the replication crisis in that field.

Kelly Jane Torrance in the National Review recommended the book, saying that it makes the 'best argument yet that we’re not even aware of much of what motivates us'.

Computer scientist Scott Aaronson praised the work on his blog, calling it a 'masterpiece' and 'Robin [Hanson]'s finest work so far'.

== See also ==
- Effective altruism which is discussed in the book as an alternative set of norms surrounding charitable giving.
- The Case Against Education, a book by Bryan Caplan which makes a similar case to The Elephant in the Brain that education is mostly about signalling intelligence, conformity and conscientiousness
- RAND Health Insurance Experiment, an experiment discussed in the chapter on medicine
