= Iowa Electronic Markets =

Not-for-profit group of futures markets

Iowa Electronic Market for 2008 Democratic National Primary. The Obama spike in February is a result of Super Tuesday.

The Iowa Electronic Markets (IEM) are a group of real-money prediction markets/futures markets operated by the University of Iowa Tippie College of Business. Unlike normal futures markets, the IEM is not-for-profit; the markets are run for educational and research purposes.

== Overview ==
External videos
- Iowa Electronic Markets on YouTube

The IEM allows traders to buy and sell contracts based on, among other things, political election results and economic indicators. Some markets are only available to academic traders. The IEM also trades futures based on financial markets, such as predicting whether the Fed Funds rate will be increased at the next meeting.

The IEM has often been used to predict the results of political elections with a greater accuracy than traditional polls. In a study, 964 election polls were compared with the five US presidential elections from 1988 to 2004. Berg et al. (2008) showed that the Iowa Electronic Markets topped the polls 74% of the time. In the 2008 election the IEM predicted the final vote count to within half a percentage point.

A precursor to the IEM was the Iowa Political Stock Market (IPSM), invented by George Neumann, and developed by Neumann, Robert E. Forsythe, and Forrest Nelson.

=== Rules and limits ===
The IEM is neither regulated by the U.S. Commodity Futures Trading Commission (CFTC) nor by any other agency due to its academic focus and the small sums that are involved. Indeed, the IEM has received two no-action letters that extend no‑action relief. A speculator may put at risk in the IEM only between $5 and $500. In contrast, other future markets like Nadex are regulated by the CFTC and allow speculators to take on or financially offset significant amounts of risk regarding economic events or the prices of commodities.

== See also ==
- The Wisdom of Crowds
- NewsFutures
- Intrade
- TradeSports
- PredictIt
