= The Case Against Education =

2018 book by Bryan Caplan

- Author: Bryan Caplan
- Audio read by: Allan Robertson
- Language: English
- Subject: Education; economics
- Publisher: Princeton University Press
- Publication date: January 30, 2018
- Publication place: United States
- Media type: Print; Digital; Audiobook
- Pages: 417 Hardcover
- ISBN: 978-0691174655

The Case Against Education: Why the Education System Is a Waste of Time and Money is a book written by libertarian economist Bryan Caplan and published in 2018 by Princeton University Press. Drawing on the economic concept of job market signaling and research in educational psychology, the book argues that much of higher education is very inefficient and has only a small effect in improving human capital, contrary to the conventional consensus in labor economics.

Caplan argues that the primary function of education is not to enhance students' skills but to certify their intelligence, conscientiousness, and conformity—attributes that are valued by employers. He ultimately estimates that approximately 80% of individuals' return to education is the result of signaling, with the remainder due to human capital accumulation.

== Summary ==
=== Human capital model ===
The foundation of the drive to increase educational attainment across the board is the human capital model of education, which began with the research of Gary Becker. The model suggests that increasing educational attainment causes increased prosperity by endowing students with increased skills. As a consequence, subsidies to education are seen as a positive investment that increases economic growth and creates spillover effects by improving civic engagement, happiness, health, etc.

Caplan argues against the model due to several contradictions, though he does not dispute that higher educational attainment is strongly correlated with increased individual income. He highlights how most adults rarely remember much of what they were taught in school not related to their career besides English and math, and even the latter two are inadequate. He also analyzes the sheepskin effect, where the largest increases in income from higher educational attainment occur after attaining an academic degree, but not for those who dropped out of college despite usually having completed some courses. He finally criticizes educational inflation, the increasing educational requirements for occupations that do not require them, as indicating educational attainment is relative and not nearly as beneficial for society as portrayed.

=== Signaling model ===
The main alternative to the human capital model of education is the signaling model of education. The idea of job market signaling through educational attainment goes back to the work of Michael Spence. The model Spence developed suggested that, even if a student did not gain any skills through an educational program, the program can still be useful so long as the signal from completing the program is correlated with traits that predict job performance.

Throughout the book, Caplan details a series of observations that suggest a significant role for signaling in the return to education:

- Intelligence and conscientiousness are known predictors of educational and occupational success, and are relatively stable throughout a person's life.
- International estimates of the effect of an additional year of education on national income are much lower than those estimating the impact of an additional year of education on personal income.
- Many students forget material over the summer and after the end of a class. Adults also forget much of the information they learned in school. This builds on Caplan's earlier book, The Myth of the Rational Voter.)
- Students look to take courses that offer easy As, instead of more difficult courses.
- The sheepskin effect seems to be fairly large.
- Transfer of learning to other disciplines appears to be low or nonexistent.

Given the above signs of signaling, Caplan argues in chapters five and six that the selfish return of education is greater than the social return, suggesting that greater educational attainment creates a negative externality. In other words, status is zero-sum; skill is not.

=== Cost–benefit analysis of going to college ===
For many students, Caplan argues that most of the negative social return to pursuing further education comes from the incursion of student debt and lost employment opportunities for students who are unlikely to complete college. He suggests that these students would be better served by vocational education.

== Policy recommendations ==
Caplan advocates two major policy responses to the problem of signaling in education:

1. Educational austerity
2. Increased vocational education

The first recommendation is that government needs to sharply cut education funding, since public education spending in the United States across all levels tops $1 trillion annually. The second recommendation is to encourage greater vocational education, because students who are unlikely to succeed in college should develop practical skills to function in the labor market. Caplan argues for an increased emphasis on vocational education that is similar in nature to the systems in Germany and Switzerland.

== Reviews ==
The book has received diverse reviews, especially for its argument that students spend too much time on formal education as opposed to concentrating on skill enhancement.

=== Positive ===
- Robin Hanson at Overcoming Bias
- Naomi Schaefer Riley in The Wall Street Journal
- Gene Epstein in City Journal

=== Mixed ===
- Stephen L. Carter in Bloomberg Opinion
  - "I'm not sure he's right, especially about education being almost entirely for the purpose of signaling, but goodness does he make a strong case. Agree with him or not, you'll never look at the schools and colleges in quite the same way."
- Tyler Cowen in Marginal Revolution
- Ilya Somin at Reason

=== Negative ===
- Sarah Carr in The Washington Post
- Joshua Kim at Inside Higher Ed

== Interviews ==
- Sean Illing at Vox

== See also ==
- Big Five personality traits
- Credential inflation
  - Grade inflation
- Education economics
- Intelligence
- Labor economics
