= Jim Bell =

American crypto-anarchist

- Born: James Dalton Bell; 1958 (age 67–68); Akron, Ohio
- Occupations: Scientist, engineer, inventor, essayist, author, political dissident
- Known for: Essay "Assassination Politics", conflict with the federal government of the United States and its agents

James Dalton Bell (born 1958) is an American crypto-anarchist who created the idea of arranging for anonymously sponsored assassination payments via the Internet, which he called "assassination politics". He was imprisoned on felony charges of tax evasion in 1997. In 2001, Wired called Bell "[o]ne of the Internet's most famous essayists" and "the world's most notorious crypto-convict".

In April 1995, Bell authored the first part of a 10-part essay called "Assassination Politics", which described an assassination market in which anonymous benefactors could securely order the killings of government officials or others who are violating citizens' rights. Following an investigation by the Internal Revenue Service (IRS), Bell was arrested and subsequently jailed for 11 months on felony charges of harassment and using false Social Security numbers.

After his April 2000 release, Bell publicly announced that he believed that there was extensive Federal Government corruption associated with his 1997–2000 criminal case, and that he was going to research the facts and file a lawsuit. Bell filed this lawsuit in 2003. Bell was put under heavy surveillance and rearrested for harassment and stalking of federal agents. He was charged with intimidation and stalking and was convicted and again imprisoned, this time for a decade-long sentence. Bell protested vociferously against the conduct of the trial, going so far as to file civil lawsuits against two judges, at least two prosecutors, his former probation officers, and his defense attorneys, but ultimately to no avail. He was released in December 2009, only to be rearrested in July 2010 for violating his supervised release conditions. Bell's parole violation hearing resulted in another sentence, and Bell was released on March 12, 2012.

== Background ==
Bell was born in Akron, Ohio and attended the Massachusetts Institute of Technology where he earned a degree in chemistry. After graduation, he worked for Intel as an electrical engineer before founding his own computer storage device company, SemiDisk Systems in 1982. When his company closed in 1992, Bell said he developed a "phobia" of financial and tax-related issues. He had been a Libertarian Party member and described his political beliefs as anarcho-libertarian. Bell attended three meetings of the Multnomah County Common Law Court (possessing no judicial authority according to Federal government laws) in Portland, Oregon, which put government officials on trial in absentia and awarded judgements against them. Bell attended these meetings in order to find government 'plants' in that group. Bell subsequently became involved in a tax dispute with the Internal Revenue Service, which stated that he owed $30,000 to the federal government.

== "Assassination Politics" essay ==
From 1995 through early 1996, Bell authored an essay entitled "Assassination Politics" in which he described the idea of using digital signatures through email to create an assassination market, "predicting" the deaths of "violators of rights, usually either government employees, officeholders, or appointees". Bell also speculated that some people could use these net-based markets quite openly without encryption (Part 10 of the essay). So there were two ways theorized to operate the scheme, one complex and secure and the other more open and potentially insecure. In effect, the arrangement would create an incentive for people to assassinate corrupt government officials, offering a reward that could be claimed by someone willing to submit an entry predicting a given person's death at a particular time. If that person died at about that time, the correct bettor would win the pool money. Bell published his idea in a 10-part essay titled "Assassination Politics" on the alt.anarchism USENET newsgroup. Described by Wired as "an unholy mix of encryption, anonymity, and digital cash to bring about the ultimate annihilation of all forms of government", the essay was nominated for a Chrysler Award for Innovation in Design in 1998 as "an imaginative and sophisticated perspective for improving governmental accountability". Although the U.S. Supreme Court has ruled that advocating violence against government officials is, in the absence of an "incitement to imminent lawless action", protected by the First Amendment, the publication of "Assassination Politics" put Bell under the scrutiny of federal investigators in 1995. The Cypherpunks list archives include many references to, what became known as ' AP' and ' APster ' from 1996 onwards. The names "assassination politics" and "Jim Bell" also cropped up in the US government's pursuit and prosecution of Carl Johnson (The CJ Files). In 2001, an Australian anarchist claimed to be acting on the 'Part 10' part of "Assassination Politics". This was covered by Declan McCullagh in Wired's story titled "Online Cincy Cop Threats Probed". Later, in 2003, The Denver Post published a similar story titled "Online threats target Denver investigators – Anarchist says e-mails harmless; feds disagree". This story was written by Jim Hughes. The essay attracted interest from theorists long before and after its author's legal entanglements; libertarian economist Bob Murphy criticised the assassination politics scheme in a pair of articles titled "The Politics of Destruction" in 2002. Murphy claimed that assassination politics was both technically infeasible and ideologically undesirable – from an anarcho-capitalist perspective (crypto-anarchism being a form of anarcho-capitalism). Others, such as research fellow at IDSA, R. Sukumaran, argue that assassination markets as suggested by Bell are perhaps technically feasible, but because they are so revolutionary, they "threaten elites" and will be made illegal. However, Sukumaran argues that AP was revived within DARPA by Poindexter with FutureMAP, an attempt to "extrapolate the Iowa Presidential markets system to the prediction of terroristic events" under the "interest of national security." Mike Huben has argued that were Assassination Politics ever to be accepted then governments would merely operate secretly (critiques of libertarianism). Almost all commentary so far has focused on the first nine parts of the essay and there is little on part 10.

== Investigation, prosecution and imprisonment ==
According to testimony by a federal agent, the federal government began infiltrating the Multnomah County Common Law Court via Steven Walsh, a government agent who attended the meetings under a false name and who even began to lead the organization. According to court documents, Bell attended three meetings of the group nearly a year after Walsh's infiltration.

In February 1997, the Internal Revenue Service acted on Bell's tax debt, docking his wages and seizing his automobile. Inside the car, investigators found bomb-making instructions, political literature, and detailed information concerning cyanide and fertilizer.

IRS officers raided Bell's home on April 1, 1997. He was arrested in May of that year, and, in July, he pleaded guilty to charges of obstruction of IRS agents and the use of a false Social Security number (officials alleged that he had used four such numbers since 1984 in order to conceal his assets; Bell said that he did not believe anyone had a right to know his real Social Security number).

As part of his plea bargain, Bell pleaded guilty in July 1997 to collecting the names and home addresses of IRS employees, and the home addresses of FBI, Bureau of Alcohol, Tobacco and Firearms agents and police in Clark County, Washington; Bell also accepted responsibility for conducting a stinkbomb attack in the Vancouver IRS office. He was convicted of the two low-level felonies and sentenced in December 1997 to eleven months in prison followed by three years of federal probation. As a condition of his sentence, Bell was compelled to pay, upon his release, $1,359 in restitution for the stinkbomb attack. He was also subjected to three years of supervised release, during which he was barred from accessing computers and from possessing chemicals.

In Bell's June 2003 lawsuit, Bell accused the federal government of extorting the 1997 plea agreement from him. Bell asserted that when he balked at that agreement in November 1997, in part due to the government's violation of the terms, government agents instructed fellow inmate Ryan Thomas Lund to assault Bell. The lawsuit alleged that Lund did this at about 6:00 P.M. on November 25, 1997, for the purpose of intimidating Bell, and to keep Bell away from his family and the news media. Later, in an ostensibly unrelated event, Lund filed a lawsuit stating that on December 14, 1997, two days after Bell's December 12, 1997 sentencing, Lund (who was in solitary confinement at the time due to his assault on Bell) had a "slip and fall" accident while alone in his cell, ostensibly due to a wet cell floor. Lund had also been promised a 27-month sentence for his illegal possession of firearms and methamphetamine, when the relevant federal law required a mandatory 10-year sentence. Bell alleged that the sentence reduction and lawsuit payoff were engineered to reward Lund for extorting Bell. Bell claimed that he was kept under "inhumane conditions for at least ten days".

Bell further alleged in his 2003 lawsuit that a forged appeal case, number 99-30210, was entered into the court record. He stated that "Ninth Circuit Court personnel ... began corruptly falsifying, forging, and improperly adding to and deleting from the Ninth Circuit Court documentary record ... with regard to appeal #99-30210." Bell's October 2004 amendment further alleges that, a handwritten note, "purportedly signed by Bell, but not in Bell's handwriting style", was forged to the Ninth Circuit Court of Appeals. He alleges that this notice of appeal was filed around June 20, 1999 (claim 505), and that, "... Ninth Circuit personnel agreed to and did continually add false records to that docket, and at various times they deleted some of those false records and substituted new false records, for the purposes of concealing the true events and for continuing to obstruct Bell's access to justice and his constitutional rights." (Claim 510) In his lawsuit, Bell seeks to establish that over a dozen government employees were guilty of numerous felonies.

== Release and conviction ==
I once believed it's too bad that there are a lot of people who work for government who are hard-working and honest people who will get hit (by Assassination Politics) and it's a shame ... Well, I don't believe that any more. They are all either crooks or they tolerate crooks or they are aware of crooks among their numbers.

— Jim Bell in interview with Wired, on 2000-11-11.

Bell served his prison sentence at a federal medium-security prison in Phoenix, Arizona, from which he was released in April 2000. He was rearrested in June of the same year on the charge of violating several of his 36 probation conditions, and was returned in November 2000 to a federal detention center at SeaTac, Washington following a search of his home that Bell called a "disguised burglary".

Bell had conducted sousveillance against Bureau of Alcohol, Tobacco and Firearms agents, using public databases and legally obtained CD-ROMs, "to let them know that surveillance can be done in both directions." Over a six-month period, Bell also compiled evidence of what he alleged was illegal surveillance of him by a government agency. In the days leading up to his arrest, he claimed that the agency had unlawfully installed a covert listening device in his home and a GPS tracking device in his car; during the subsequent trial, the ATF admitted to planting the device.

Bell alleged in his 2003 lawsuit that the government employees had actually planted an illegal GPS tracking device in his car months before the one ostensibly allowed by the October 2000 warrant, at least as early as Bell's April 2000 release from prison. The information from that prior device could not be used, however, because there was no warrant allowing it to be planted. Bell also alleged that federal government employees had illegally planted a GPS tracking transmitter in a vehicle he drove in June 1998, one which the government never disclosed. Bell further stated that his defense lawyers colluded to keep him from being able to demand disclosure of all such secretly planted devices.

The double standard here is simply incredible. They simply don't like the idea that Jim Bell can simply look through a few databases, find one of their people, and publish the name on the Internet. They hate that. They're trying to make it look like I've been intimidating them. They've been intimidating me. I wasn't all that happy before, but I'm hopping mad ... if you think this is going to stop me, baloney.

— Jim Bell in interview with Wired, on 2000-11-21.

Bell pleaded not guilty to violating 18 U.S.C. section 2281, a law prohibiting the intimidation of family members of federal agents and some forms of stalking. The charges specified that Bell had performed Internet background checks on federal agents he asserted were harassing him, and Bell defended his actions by saying he was using public records to defend against what he saw as harassment by government officials. Journalist Declan McCullagh wrote, "[Bell] says, and a good number of observers agree, that the Feds are prosecuting him for doing what an investigative reporter does: Compiling information from publicly available databases, documenting what's happening, and so on. This case could set a precedent that affects the First Amendment privilege of journalists."

Declan McCullagh asserts that during the trial, the judge sealed the entire court file, forbade the defense from issuing subpoenas to witnesses, granted the prosecution significant latitude in making negative suggestions about Bell's character, and refused requests for a mistrial. McCullagh also asserts that he was subpoenaed by two Treasury Department agents to appear before the court, without being notified ahead of time as required by federal regulations regarding subpoenas involving the media. Following the conviction, Jim Bell renewed his attempts at firing his court-appointed lawyer, appealing his case to the Supreme Court, and filing civil lawsuits against those he alleges were involved in an orchestrated conspiracy to deny him a fair trial and an unbiased, court-appointed defense counsel; his targets included two judges, at least two prosecutors, and his former probation officers and defense attorneys.

== Patent application for isotope-modified optical fiber ==
In February 2012, Bell applied for a patent on an invention which would improve fiber optic communication speeds and assist in transmitting long distances. Although yet to produce any fiber, Bell states his mathematical models show the velocity of light within the fiber can be improved from 68% to 98% of the speed of light with lower optical loss and dispersion which would allow light pulses to be transmitted for longer distances without being smeared together over time and distance.

== See also ==
- Anarcho-capitalist revolution
- Dead pool
- Futarchy
- Prediction market
- Propaganda of the deed
- Tontine
