= Zero-intelligence trader =

A zero-intelligence trader (ZI) is a simple algorithmic trader in a market based on the dumb agent theory who proposes to purchase (bid) or to sell (ask) randomly, subject only to minimal constraints. Constraints might be resource or bankruptcy constraints imposed externally by the rules of the market. Ownership of sufficient resources to buy the items the trader bids for, or ownership of resources the trader offers for sale are examples of such market-imposed constraints. Alternatively, the constraints may be internal to the trader. Not bidding more than the value of the resource to the trader, and not asking less than the cost of the resource to the trader are examples of such internal constraints. Under either interpretation, ZI traders use minimal intelligence in choosing their actions in markets.

Simple double auctions tend to achieve high levels of allocative efficiency even when they are populated by zero-intelligence traders. This result has been used to show that the aggregate level properties of markets can be quite different from the behavior and properties of individuals who participate in them. Specifically, any non-rationality of individuals does not necessarily carry over into the outcomes of markets.

The simple form of this algorithmic trader allows it to serve as a convenient tool to explore and identify properties that can be attributed to various kinds of market institutions. Performance of markets populated with ZI traders has also served as a benchmark to compare the performance of various market and other social institutions.
