= Countersign =

Countersign may refer to one of the following :

- Countersign (military), a sign used by a sentry or guard.
- Countersign (legal), the writing of a second signature onto a document.

== See also ==
- Countersignaling, a social behaviour related to finance
