= Robin Hanson =

American economist and author (born 1959)

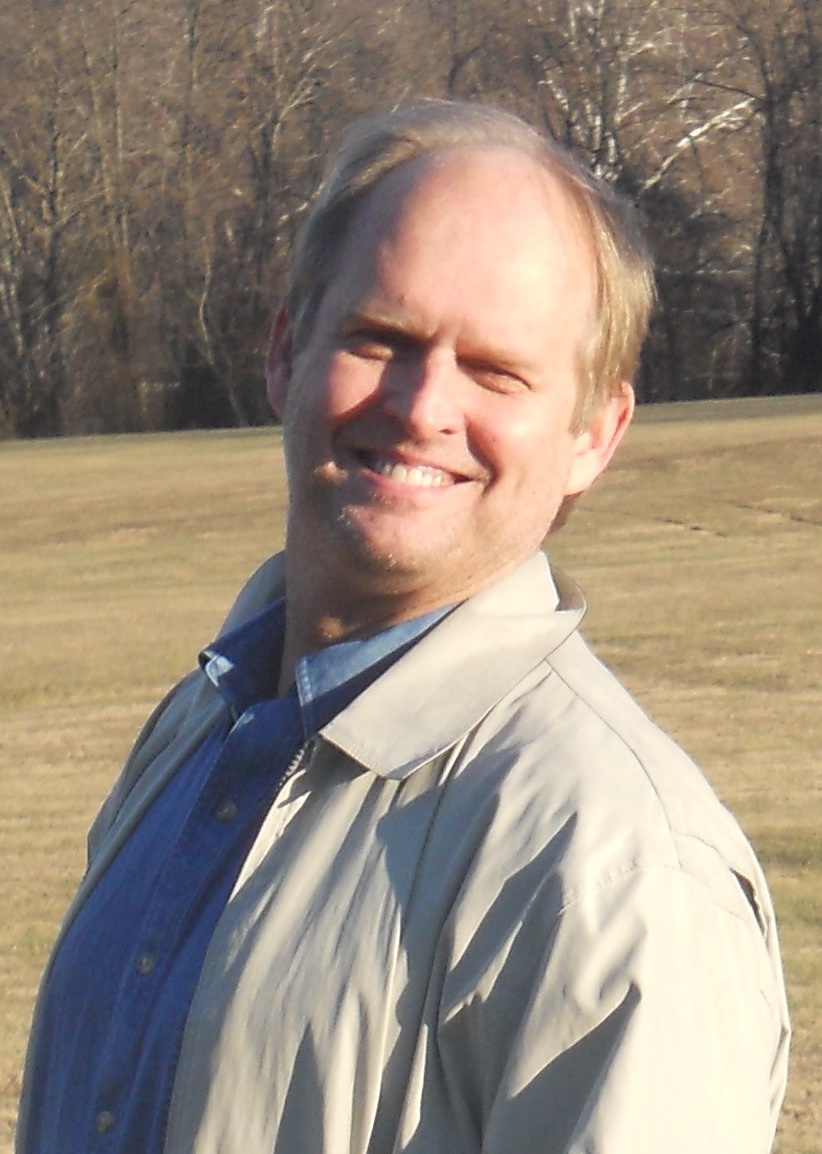
- Hanson in 2011
- Born: Robin Dale Hanson; August 28, 1959 (age 67)
- Education: University of California, Irvine (BS); University of Chicago (MS, MA); California Institute of Technology (PhD)
- Occupation: Economist
- Organization(s): George Mason University; Future of Humanity Institute (former)
- Known for: FutureMAP, LMSR, Foresight Institute
- Notable work: The Elephant in the Brain; The Age of Em

Robin Dale Hanson (born August 28, 1959) is an American economist and author. He is an associate professor of economics at George Mason University and a former research associate at the Future of Humanity Institute of Oxford University. Hanson is known for his work on idea futures and markets, and he was involved in the creation of the Foresight Institute's Foresight Exchange and DARPA's FutureMAP project. He invented market scoring rules like LMSR (Logarithmic Market Scoring Rule) used by prediction markets such as Consensus Point (where Hanson was Chief Scientist), and has conducted research on signalling. He also proposed the Great Filter hypothesis.

== Background ==
Hanson received a BS in physics from the University of California, Irvine in 1981, an MS in physics and an MA in Conceptual Foundations of Science from the University of Chicago in 1984, and a PhD in social science from Caltech in 1997 for his thesis titled Four puzzles in information and politics: Product bans, informed voters, social insurance, and persistent disagreement. Before getting his PhD he researched artificial intelligence, Bayesian statistics and hypertext publishing at Lockheed, NASA, and elsewhere. In addition, he started the first internal corporate prediction market at Xanadu in 1990.

He is married to Peggy Jackson, a hospice social worker, and has two children. He is the son of a Southern Baptist preacher. Hanson has elected to have his brain cryonically preserved after death. He was involved early on in the creation of the Rationalist community through online weblogs.

== Views ==
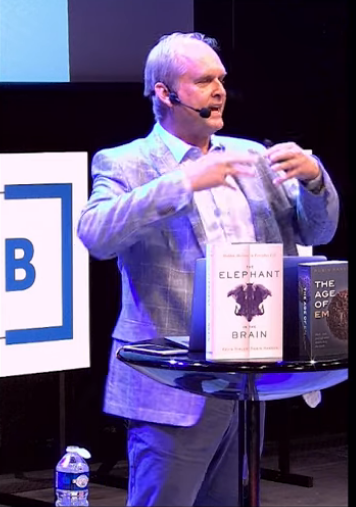
Robin Hanson discussing alternative economic-legal systems at the 2019 Institute of Cryptoanarchy Conference

=== Prediction markets ===
Robin Hanson is credited with originating the concept of the Policy Analysis Market (PAM), a DARPA project to implement a market for betting on future developments in the Middle East. Hanson wrote that the cancellation of FutureMAP followed controversy over betting on terrorist attacks, after the Senate had voted to cut funding over privacy concerns about the related Total Information Awareness program. He also created and supports a proposed system of government called futarchy, in which policies would be determined by prediction markets.

Nate Silver has described Hanson's view on prediction markets, saying "[Hanson's] argument for these is pretty simple: They ensure that we have a financial stake in being accurate when we make forecasts, rather than just trying to look good to our peers."

=== Sex ===
In a 2018 blog post on the incel movement, Hanson compared concern about income inequality with concern about unequal access to sex. He wrote that he found it puzzling that similar concern had not been shown for incels as for low-income individuals. Some journalists, such as Alexandra Scaggs in the Financial Times, criticized Hanson for discussing sex as if it was a commodity.

Hanson has been criticized for his writings relating to sexual relationships and women. "If you've ever heard of George Mason University economist Robin Hanson, there's a good chance it was because he wrote something creepy", Slate columnist Jordan Weissmann wrote in 2018. In an article on bias against women in economics, Bloomberg columnist Noah Smith cited a blog post by Hanson comparing cuckoldry to "gentle silent rape", lamenting that there was no retraction and no outcry from fellow economists. In The New Yorker, Jia Tolentino described Hanson's 2018 blog post as a "flippantly dehumanizing thought experiment". Hanson later denied proposing an entitlement to sex and said he was more interested in sexual inequality generally than in the incel activist community.

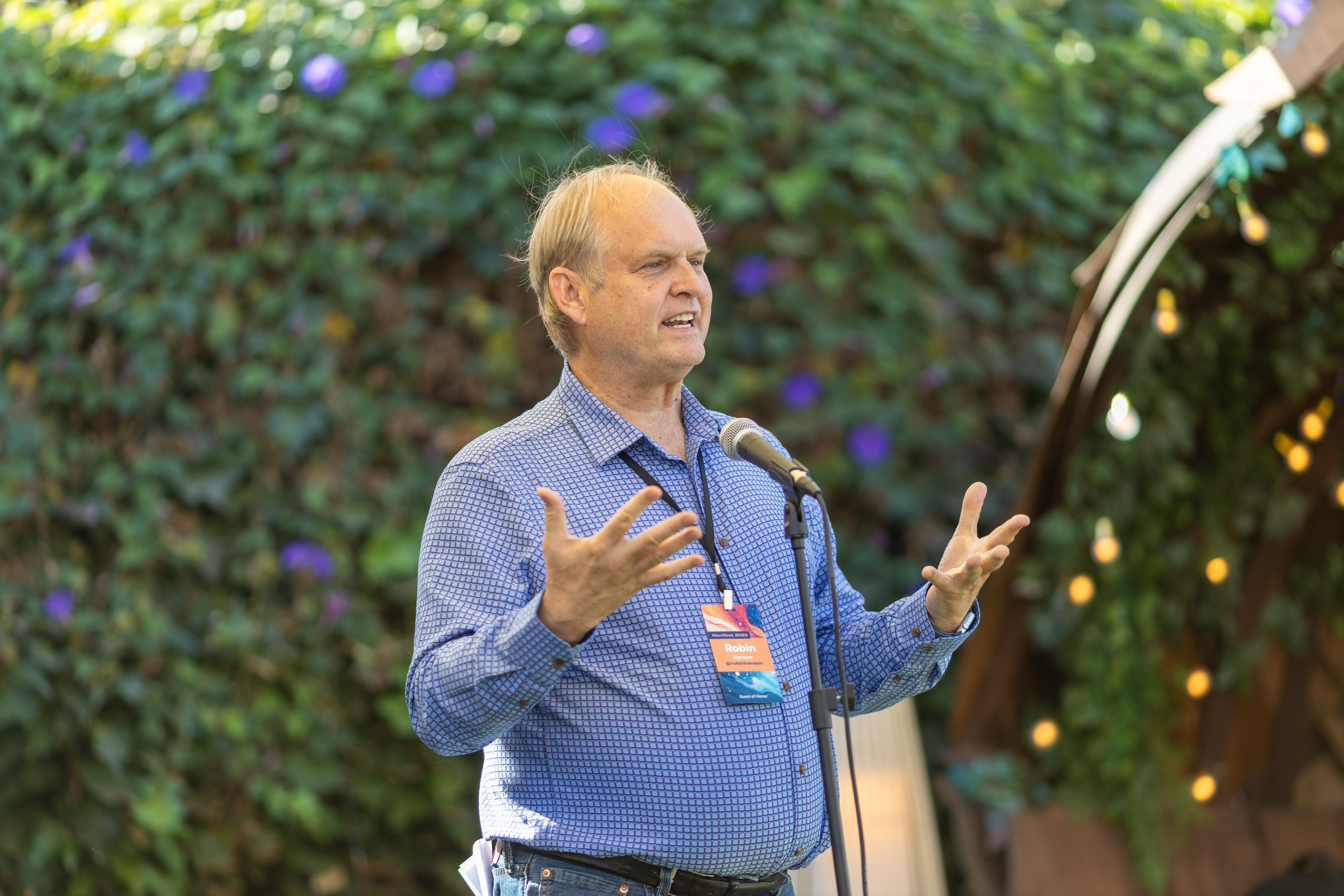
Robin Hanson discussing prediction markets at the 2023 Manifest conference

=== Cryonics ===
Hanson is an advocate for cryonics and a member of the Alcor Life Extension Foundation, a cryonics organization that preserves human remains in the hope of future revival.

=== Great Filter ===
Hanson coined the term Great Filter, referring to whatever prevents "dead matter" from becoming an expanding and observable intelligent civilization, as a possible resolution of the Fermi Paradox. He was motivated to seek his doctorate so that his theories would reach a wider audience.

== Books ==
Hanson has written two books. The Age of Em (2016) concerns his views on brain emulation and its eventual impact on society. The Elephant in the Brain (2018), coauthored with Kevin Simler, looks at mental blind spots of society and individuals.
