= NewsFutures =

Prediction markets company NewsFutures (2000-2010) evolved into Lumenogic (2010-2019), "a consulting firm that specializes in developing and customizing online systems for large organizations to use to gather so-called Collective Intelligence from their employees", which in turn became Hypermind (born 2019).

Founded in May 2000 by Émile Servan-Schreiber and Maurice Balick, NewsFutures, Inc. was one of the earliest providers of prediction markets to both the general public and private companies. It played a leading role in applying collective intelligence and prediction markets to business forecasting, innovation, and decision making. It was one of several companies that help large corporations set up private prediction markets to capture the collective foresight of their employees or client base, as described in James Surowiecki's book The Wisdom of Crowds. NewsFutures is one of the few prediction market companies cited in the book.

From September 2000 to October 2009, NewsFutures operated one of the best known prediction market games on the Web, listing contracts on over 120,000 events on a wide variety of topics in current events, politics, finance, and sports. The accuracy of its predictions was recognized by James "wisdom of crowds" Surowiecki himself, when he wrote in the New Yorker in 2003: "In a sense, the NewsFutures traders are only trying to do what op-ed writers, TV pundits, and Presidential advisers attempt to do every day: predict the future. The big difference is that the markets are far more likely to be right." In his book, Surowiecki called it one of "the two most important online trading sites," the other being Intrade.

NewsFutures founder Émile Servan-Schreiber, a son of famed journalist and politician Jean-Jacques Servan-Schreiber, has been a leading proponent of the idea that prediction markets should be viewed as "quasi journalistic" ventures, i.e., that their predictions are newsworthy content.

The NewsFutures market had a distinctive international flavor because it also operated markets in French and in Hungarian, enabling U.S.-based players to trade with European counterparts, each in their own language. From November 2001 to January 2004, USA Today co-branded the NewsFutures Sports and Money prediction markets.

During the 2003-2004 National Football League season, the play-money predictions of NewsFutures were systematically compared to the real-money predictions of TradeSports (now Intrade) and found to be just as accurate. This result contradicted the conventional wisdom that "putting your money where your mouth is" should enhance prediction market accuracy, and it has served to enhance the credibility of play-money markets and boost their adoption in enterprise contexts where real-money betting is illegal.

NewsFutures also launched in 2007 the first charity-driven prediction market, Bet2Give, where real money was being wagered but all profits had to be given to charities of the winner's choice.
