= Dumb agent theory =

Hypothesis in economics regarding true value of stocks by consensus

The dumb agent theory (DAT) states that many people making individual buying and selling decisions will better reflect true value than any one individual can. In finance this theory is predicated on the efficient-market hypothesis (EMH). One of the first instances of the dumb agent theory in action was with the Policy Analysis Market (PAM); a futures exchange developed by DARPA. While this project was quickly abandoned by the Pentagon, its idea is now implemented in futures exchanges and prediction markets such as Intrade, Newsfutures and Predictify. The DAT is technically a hypothesis, not a theory.

While first mentioned strictly by name in relation to PAM in 2003, the dumb agent theory was originally conceived (as the Dumb Smart Market) by James Surowiecki in 1999. Here, Surowiecki differentiated from the EMH stating that it "doesn't mean that markets are always right." Instead, he argues that markets are subject to manias and panics because "people are always shouting out" their stock picks. This, in turn, results in other investors worrying about these picks and becoming influenced by them, which ultimately drives the markets (irrationally) up or down. His argument states that if market decisions were made independently of each other, and with the sole goal of being correct (as opposed to being in line with what others are choosing), then the markets would produce the best choice possible and eliminate biases such as groupthink, the bandwagon effect and the Abilene paradox.

== PAM ==
The Policy Analysis Market (PAM), while technically a futures market, was described as utilizing the dumb agent theory. The main difference, as argued by James Surowiecki, is that in a futures market the current stock prices are known in advance, while in order for the dumb agent theory to work, they should be unknown to the investor prior to the decision making period (which is possible only with a prediction market).

== Prediction markets ==
For the dumb agent theory to hold, investors should not know what other investors are doing prior to making their decision. While this is technically impossible in a futures exchange (because what other people are deciding dictates the price of the security), it can be done in a Prediction Market. Certain prediction markets are set up in this manner (Such as Predictify, although it allows for participants to change their answers after their initial prediction).

== Dumb agent theory outside the financial markets ==
USS Scorpion (SSN-589) was a nuclear submarine of the United States Navy lost at sea on June 5, 1968. While a public search did not yield any clues as to its location, Dr. John Craven, the Chief Scientist of the U.S. Navy's Special Projects Division, decided to employ the Bayesian search theory in order to establish its location. This involved formulating different hypotheses as to its location and using a probability distribution to combine the information and find the point of highest probability. The different hypotheses were taken from various independent sources, such as mathematicians, submarine specialists, and salvage men. The point Craven found ended up being 220 yards from the actual position of the sunken vessel.
