= The Wisdom of Crowds =

2004 book by James Surowiecki

- Cover of mass market edition by Anchor
- Author: James Surowiecki
- Language: English
- Publisher: Doubleday; Anchor
- Publication date: 2004
- Publication place: United States
- Pages: 336
- ISBN: 978-0-385-50386-0
- OCLC: 61254310
- Dewey Decimal: 303.3/8 22
- LC Class: JC328.2 .S87 2005

The Wisdom of Crowds: Why the Many Are Smarter Than the Few and How Collective Wisdom Shapes Business, Economies, Societies and Nations, published in 2004, is a book written by James Surowiecki about the aggregation of information in groups, resulting in decisions that, he argues, are often better than could have been made by any single member of the group. The book presents numerous case studies and anecdotes to illustrate its argument, and touches on several fields, primarily economics and psychology.

The opening anecdote relates Francis Galton's surprise that the crowd at a county fair accurately guessed the weight of an ox when the median of their individual guesses was taken (the median was closer to the ox's true butchered weight than the estimates of most crowd members).

The book relates to diverse collections of independently deciding individuals, rather than crowd psychology as traditionally understood. Its central thesis, that a diverse collection of independently deciding individuals is likely to make certain types of decisions and predictions better than individuals or even experts, draws many parallels with statistical sampling; however, there is little overt discussion of statistics in the book.

Its title is an allusion to Charles Mackay's Extraordinary Popular Delusions and the Madness of Crowds, published in 1841.

== Types of crowd wisdom ==
Surowiecki breaks down the advantages he sees in disorganized decisions into three main types, which he classifies as

Cognition
Thinking and information processing, such as market judgment, which he argues can be much faster, more reliable, and less subject to political forces than the deliberations of experts or expert committees.
Coordination
Coordination of behavior includes optimizing the utilization of a popular bar and not colliding in moving traffic flows. The book is replete with examples from experimental economics, but this section relies more on naturally occurring experiments such as pedestrians optimizing the pavement flow or the extent of crowding in popular restaurants. He examines how common understanding within a culture allows remarkably accurate judgments about specific reactions of other members of the culture.
Cooperation
How groups of people can form networks of trust without a central system controlling their behavior or directly enforcing their compliance. This section is especially pro free market.

== Four elements required to form a wise crowd ==
Not all crowds (groups) are wise. Consider, for example, mobs or crazed investors in a stock market bubble. According to Surowiecki, these key criteria separate wise crowds from irrational ones:

Criteria	Description
Diversity of opinion	Each person should have private information even if it is just an eccentric interpretation of the known facts. (Chapter 2)
Independence	People's opinions are not determined by the opinions of those around them. (Chapter 3)
Decentralization	People are able to specialize and draw on local knowledge. (Chapter 4)
Aggregation	Some mechanism exists for turning private judgements into a collective decision. (Chapter 5)

Based on Surowiecki's book, Oinas-Kukkonen captures the wisdom of crowds approach with the following eight conjectures:

1. It is possible to describe how people in a group think as a whole.
2. In some cases, groups are remarkably intelligent and are often smarter than the smartest people in them.
3. The three conditions for a group to be intelligent are diversity, independence, and decentralization.
4. The best decisions are a product of disagreement and contest.
5. Too much communication can make the group as a whole less intelligent.
6. Information aggregation functionality is needed.
7. The right information needs to be delivered to the right people in the right place, at the right time, and in the right way.
8. There is no need to chase the expert.

== Failures of crowd intelligence ==
Surowiecki studies situations (such as rational bubbles) in which the crowd produces very bad judgment, and argues that in these types of situations their cognition or cooperation failed because (in one way or another) the members of the crowd were too conscious of the opinions of others and began to emulate each other and conform rather than think differently. Although he gives experimental details of crowds collectively swayed by a persuasive speaker, he says that the main reason that groups of people intellectually conform is that the system for making decisions has a systemic flaw.

Causes and detailed case histories of such failures include:

Extreme	Description
Homogeneity	Surowiecki stresses the need for diversity within a crowd to ensure enough variance in approach, thought process, and private information.
Centralization	The 2003 Space Shuttle Columbia disaster, which he blames on a hierarchical NASA management bureaucracy that was totally closed to the wisdom of low-level engineers.
Division	The United States Intelligence Community, the 9/11 Commission Report claims, failed to prevent the 11 September 2001 attacks partly because information held by one subdivision was not accessible by another. Surowiecki's argument is that crowds (of intelligence analysts in this case) work best when they choose for themselves what to work on and what information they need. (He cites the SARS-virus isolation as an example in which the free flow of data enabled laboratories around the world to coordinate research without a central point of control.) The Office of the Director of National Intelligence and the CIA have created a Wikipedia-style information sharing network called Intellipedia that will help the free flow of information to prevent such failures again.
Imitation	Where choices are visible and made in sequence, an "information cascade" can form in which only the first few decision makers gain anything by contemplating the choices available: once past decisions have become sufficiently informative, it pays for later decision makers to simply copy those around them. This can lead to fragile social outcomes.
Emotionality	Emotional factors, such as a feeling of belonging, can lead to peer pressure, herd instinct, and in extreme cases collective hysteria.

== Connection ==
At the 2005 O'Reilly Emerging Technology Conference Surowiecki presented a session entitled Independent Individuals and Wise Crowds, or Is It Possible to Be Too Connected?

The question for all of us is, how can you have interaction without information cascades, without losing the independence that's such a key factor in group intelligence?

He recommends:

- Keep your ties loose.
- Keep yourself exposed to as many diverse sources of information as possible.
- Make groups that range across hierarchies.

Tim O'Reilly and others also discuss the success of Google, wikis, blogging, and Web 2.0 in the context of the wisdom of crowds.

== Applications ==
Surowiecki is a strong advocate of the benefits of decision markets and regrets the failure of DARPA's controversial Policy Analysis Market to get off the ground. He points to the success of public and internal corporate markets as evidence that a collection of people with varying points of view but the same motivation (to make a good guess) can produce an accurate aggregate prediction. According to Surowiecki, the aggregate predictions have been shown to be more reliable than the output of any think tank. He advocates extensions of the existing futures markets even into areas such as terrorist activity and prediction markets within companies.

To illustrate this thesis, he says that his publisher can publish a more compelling output by relying on individual authors under one-off contracts bringing book ideas to them. In this way, they are able to tap into the wisdom of a much larger crowd than would be possible with an in-house writing team.

Will Hutton has argued that Surowiecki's analysis applies to value judgments as well as factual issues, with crowd decisions that "emerge of our own aggregated free will [being] astonishingly... decent". He concludes that "There's no better case for pluralism, diversity and democracy, along with a genuinely independent press."

Applications of the wisdom-of-crowds effect exist in three general categories: Prediction markets, Delphi methods, and extensions of the traditional opinion poll.

=== Prediction markets ===
The most common application is the prediction market, a speculative or betting market created to make verifiable predictions. Surowiecki discusses the success of prediction markets. Similar to Delphi methods but unlike opinion polls, prediction (information) markets ask questions like, "Who do you think will win the election?" and predict outcomes rather well. Answers to the question, "Who will you vote for?" are not as predictive.

Assets are cash values tied to specific outcomes (e.g., Candidate X will win the election) or parameters (e.g., Next quarter's revenue). The current market prices are interpreted as predictions of the probability of the event or the expected value of the parameter. Betfair is the world's biggest prediction exchange, with around $28 billion traded in 2007. NewsFutures is an international prediction market that generates consensus probabilities for news events. Intrade.com, which operated a person to person prediction market based in Dublin Ireland achieved very high media attention in 2012 related to the US Presidential Elections, with more than 1.5 million search references to Intrade and Intrade data. Several companies now offer enterprise class prediction marketplaces to predict project completion dates, sales, or the market potential for new ideas. A number of Web-based quasi-prediction marketplace companies have sprung up to offer predictions primarily on sporting events and stock markets but also on other topics. The principle of the prediction market is also used in project management software to let team members predict a project's "real" deadline and budget.

=== Delphi methods ===
The Delphi method is a systematic, interactive forecasting method which relies on a panel of independent experts. The carefully selected experts answer questionnaires in two or more rounds. After each round, a facilitator provides an anonymous summary of the experts' forecasts from the previous round as well as the reasons they provided for their judgments. Thus, participants are encouraged to revise their earlier answers in light of the replies of other members of the group. It is believed that during this process the range of the answers will decrease and the group will converge towards the "correct" answer. Many of the consensus forecasts have proven to be more accurate than forecasts made by individuals.

=== Human Swarming ===
Designed as an optimized method for unleashing the wisdom of crowds, this approach implements real-time feedback loops around synchronous groups of users with the goal of achieving more accurate insights from fewer numbers of users. Human Swarming (sometimes referred to as Social Swarming) is modeled after biological processes in birds, fish, and insects, and is enabled among networked users by using mediating software such as the UNU collective intelligence platform. As published by Rosenberg (2015), such real-time control systems enable groups of human participants to behave as a unified collective intelligence. When logged into the UNU platform, for example, groups of distributed users can collectively answer questions, generate ideas, and make predictions as a singular emergent entity. Early testing shows that human swarms can out-predict individuals across a variety of real-world projections.

== In popular culture ==
Hugo-winning writer John Brunner's 1975 science fiction novel The Shockwave Rider includes an elaborate planet-wide information futures and betting pool called "Delphi" based on the Delphi method.

Illusionist Derren Brown claimed to use the 'Wisdom of Crowds' concept to explain how he correctly predicted the UK National Lottery results in September 2009. His explanation was met with criticism on-line, by people who argued that the concept was misapplied. The methodology employed was too flawed; the sample of people could not have been totally objective and free in thought, because they were gathered multiple times and socialised with each other too much; a condition Surowiecki tells us is corrosive to pure independence and the diversity of mind required (Surowiecki 2004:38). Groups thus fall into groupthink where they increasingly make decisions based on influence of each other and are thus less accurate. However, other commentators have suggested that, given the entertainment nature of the show, Brown's misapplication of the theory may have been a deliberate smokescreen to conceal his true method.

This was also shown in the television series East of Eden where a social network of roughly 10,000 individuals came up with ideas to stop missiles in a very short span of time.

Wisdom of Crowds would have a significant influence on the naming of the crowdsourcing creative company Tongal, which is an anagram for Galton, the last name of the social-scientist highlighted in the introduction to Surowiecki's book. Francis Galton recognized the ability of a crowd's median weight-guesses for oxen to exceed the accuracy of experts.

== Criticism ==
In his book Embracing the Wide Sky, Daniel Tammet finds fault with this notion. Tammet points out the potential for problems in systems which have poorly defined means of pooling knowledge: Subject matter experts can be overruled and even wrongly punished by less knowledgeable persons in crowd sourced systems, citing a case of this on Wikipedia. Furthermore, Tammet mentions the assessment of the accuracy of Wikipedia as described in a study mentioned in Nature in 2005, outlining several flaws in the study's methodology which included that the study made no distinction between minor errors and large errors.

Tammet also cites the Kasparov versus the World, an online competition that pitted the brainpower of tens of thousands of online chess players choosing moves in a match against Garry Kasparov, which was won by Kasparov, not the "crowd". Although Kasparov did say, "It is the greatest game in the history of chess. The sheer number of ideas, the complexity, and the contribution it has made to chess make it the most important game ever played."

In his book You Are Not a Gadget, Jaron Lanier argues that crowd wisdom is best suited for problems that involve optimization, but ill-suited for problems that require creativity or innovation. In the online article Digital Maoism, Lanier argues that the collective is more likely to be smart only when

1. it is not defining its own questions,
2. the goodness of an answer can be evaluated by a simple result (such as a single numeric value), and
3. the information system which informs the collective is filtered by a quality control mechanism that relies on individuals to a high degree.

Lanier argues that only under those circumstances can a collective be smarter than a person. If any of these conditions are broken, the collective becomes unreliable or worse.

Iain Couzin, a professor in Princeton's Department of Ecology and Evolutionary Biology, and Albert Kao, his student, in a 2014 article in the journal Proceedings of the Royal Society B, argue that "the conventional view of the wisdom of crowds may not be informative in complex and realistic environments, and that being in small groups can maximize decision accuracy across many contexts." By "small groups," Couzin and Kao mean fewer than a dozen people. They conclude and say that “the decisions of very large groups may be highly accurate when the information used is independently sampled, but they are particularly susceptible to the negative effects of correlated information, even when only a minority of the group uses such information.”

== See also ==
- Argumentum ad populum
- Bandwagon effect
- Central limit theorem
- Collaborative filtering
- Collective intelligence
- Crowdfunding
- Crowdsourcing
- Dumb agent theory
- Efficient-market hypothesis
- Global brain
- Groupthink
- The Good Judgment Project
- Iowa Electronic Markets
- Open-source governance
- Problem solving
- Wideband delphi
