= Assassination market =

Type of market that incentivizes assassination

An assassination market is a prediction market where any party can place a bet (using anonymous electronic money and pseudonymous remailers) on the date of death of a given individual. This incentivises assassination of the individual, as parties with advance knowledge of an assassination plot can profit by betting accurately on the date of the death. Because the payoff is for accurately picking the date rather than performing the assassination, it is substantially more difficult to assign criminal liability.

Fears have been raised that popular prediction markets, such as Kalshi and Polymarket, could serve the purposes of assassination markets.

== History ==
Early uses of the terms "assassination market" and "market for assassinations" can be found (in both positive and negative lights) in 1994's "The Cyphernomicon" by Timothy C. May, a cypherpunk. The concept and its potential effects are also referred to as assassination politics, a term popularized by Jim Bell in his 1995–96 essay of the same name.

Early in part 1, Jim Bell describes the idea as:

The organization set up to manage such a system could, presumably, make up a list of people who had seriously violated the NAP (Non-aggression Principle), but who would not see justice in our courts due to the fact that their actions were done at the behest of the government. Associated with each name would be a dollar figure, the total amount of money the organization has received as a contribution, which is the amount they would give for correctly "predicting" the person's death, presumably naming the exact date. "Guessers" would formulate their "guess" into a file, encrypt it with the organization's public key, then transmit it to the organization, possibly using methods as untraceable as putting a floppy disk in an envelope and tossing it into a mailbox, but more likely either a cascade of encrypted anonymous remailers, or possibly public-access Internet locations, such as terminals at a local library, etc. In order to prevent such a system from becoming simply a random unpaid lottery, in which people can randomly guess a name and date (hoping that lightning would strike, as it occasionally does), it would be necessary to deter such random guessing by requiring the "guessers" to include with their "guess" encrypted and untraceable "digital cash," in an amount sufficiently high to make random guessing impractical.

Bell then goes on to further specify the protocol of the assassination market in more detail. In the final part of his essay, Bell posits a market that is largely non-anonymous. He contrasts this version with the one previously described. Carl Johnson's attempt to popularise the concept of assassination politics appeared to rely on the earlier version. There followed an attempt to popularise the second in 2001 that is ongoing today.

Technologies such as Tor and bitcoin have enabled online assassination markets, as described in parts one to nine of Assassination Politics.

== Assassination Market website ==
The first prediction market entitled "Assassination Market" was created by a self-described crypto-anarchist in 2013. Utilising Tor to hide the site's location and bitcoin-based bounties and prediction technology, the site listed bounties on then-incumbent US President Barack Obama, economist Ben Bernanke and former justice minister of Sweden Beatrice Ask (all of whom are still alive as of November 2026). In 2015, the site was suspected to be defunct, but the deposited bitcoins were cashed out in 2018.

== See also ==
- Dark web
- Darknet market
- Dead pool
- Policy Analysis Market
- Tontine

Popular culture

- The Assassination Bureau, Ltd, an unfinished novel by Jack London
- The Visit
- "Hated in the Nation", an episode of Black Mirror
- The Ankh-Morpork Assassins' Guild
