= Crypto-anarchy =

Political ideology

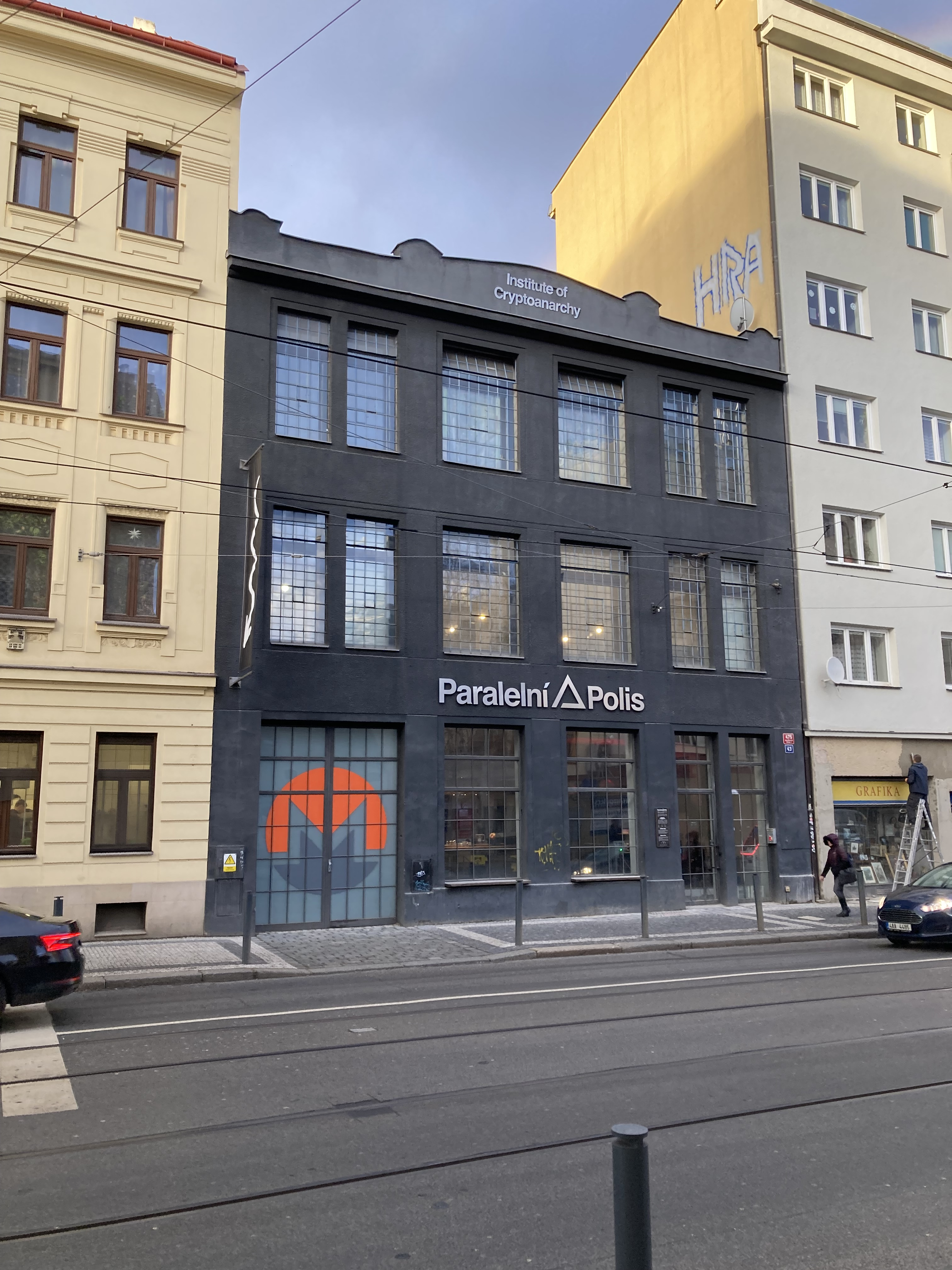
Parallel Polis, or the Institute of cryptoanarchy in Prague, 2024

Crypto-anarchy or crypto-anarchism is a current movement of anarchism focusing on the protection of privacy, political freedom, counter-surveillance, hacktivism and economic freedom. The adherents of this philosophy use cryptographic software for confidentiality and security while sending and receiving information over computer networks. In his 1988 "Crypto Anarchist Manifesto", Timothy C. May introduced the basic principles of crypto-anarchism, which include encrypted exchanges ensuring total anonymity, total freedom of speech, and total freedom to trade. In 1992, he read the text at the founding meeting of the cypherpunk movement.

== Terminology ==
The prefix "crypto-" originates from the Ancient Greek word κρυπτός kruptós, meaning "hidden" or "secret". This differs from its use in terms like 'crypto-fascist' or 'crypto-Jew' where it signifies that an identity is concealed from the world; rather, many crypto-anarchists are open about their anarchism and promotion of tools based in cryptology.

== Motives ==
One motive of crypto-anarchists is to defend against surveillance of computer networks communication. They try to protect against government mass surveillance, such as PRISM, ECHELON, Tempora, telecommunications data retention, the NSA warrantless surveillance controversy, Room 641A, the FRA and so on. Crypto-anarchists consider the development and use of cryptography to be the main defense against such problems.

A 2022 study examined whether crypto-anarchism can be a useful tool in addressing socio-political issues. Their findings revealed that crypto-anarchism does not have a significant influence on actual politics, but studying it can be useful for creating political movements geared toward Internet users.

== Anonymous trading ==
Bitcoin is a currency generated and secured by peer-to-peer networked devices that maintain a communal record of all transactions within the system that can be used in a crypto-anarchic context. Adrian Chen says the idea behind bitcoin can be traced to The Crypto Anarchist Manifesto. Silk Road was an example of an illegal drug market on which bitcoin was the only accepted currency.

Assassination Market was a Tor-based darknet market operated by a self-described crypto-anarchist going by the pseudonym Kuwabatake Sanjuro.

In "The Cyphernomicon", Timothy C. May suggests that crypto-anarchism qualifies as a form of anarcho-capitalism:

What emerges from this is unclear, but I think it will be a form of anarcho-capitalist market system I call "crypto-anarchy."

Another quote in "The Cyphernomicon" defines crypto-anarchism. Under the title "What is Crypto Anarchy?", May writes:

Some of us believe various forms of strong cryptography will cause the power of the state to decline, perhaps even collapse fairly abruptly. We believe the expansion into cyberspace, with secure communications, digital money, anonymity and pseudonymity, and other crypto-mediated interactions, will profoundly change the nature of economies and social interactions. Governments will have a hard time collecting taxes, regulating the behavior of individuals and corporations (small ones at least), and generally coercing folks when it can't even tell what continent folks are on!

== Virtual and network states ==
A network state is a theoretical community of users—called “subscriber citizens”—connected via the internet, who accumulate enough capital, territory, or political clout to achieve diplomatic recognition as a state.

For crypto-anarchists, creating such a virtual or network state to increase freedom and reduce physical coercion has been a consistent talking point since at least 1992, when Timothy May initially discussed a version of these ideas in his article, Libertaria in Cyberspace. May said:

This is the most compelling advantage of "Crypto Libertaria": an arbitrarily large number of separate "nations" can simultaneously exist. This allows for rapid experimentation, self-selection, and evolution. If folks get tired of some virtual community, they can leave. The cryptographic aspects mean their membership in some community is unknown to others (vis-a-vis the physical or outside world, i.e., their "true names") and physical coercion is reduced.

In his 1999 book, Virtual States, cypherpunk Jerry Everard explored these ideas through the lens of Foucauldian philosophy, especially in the context of discourse formation. His discourse analysis focused on the interrelationship between objects and statements describing the state. He acknowledged the state exists as a monopoly on violence in relation to its subjects. In other words, the state enjoys a power imbalance between itself and its citizenry.

Everard formulated the idea of disaggregating various elements of the nation state while considering what voluntarily procured "virtual states" in a market environment would look like. He suggests that virtual states based in cyberspace will take over the “goods and services economy” aspect of the state apparatus. In the final treatment, he did not believe the "state" would face an extinction-level event, only that its power may be diminished in some areas but strengthened in others.

Technologist, angel investor, and former Coinbase CTO, Balaji Srinivasan, has fully fleshed out the idea of network states. In his 2022 book, The Network State: How to Start Your Own Country, he details how a non-territorial affiliation of like-minded individuals could join to enact a covenant to share, build, and distribute power in the form of a network state. Srinivasan articulated the definition concisely:

A network state is a highly aligned online community with a capacity for collective action that crowdfunds territory around the world and eventually gains diplomatic recognition from pre-existing states.

He furnished a fuller, more complex articulation as well:

A network state is a social network with a moral innovation, a sense of national consciousness, a recognized founder, a capacity for collective action, an in-person level of civility, an integrated cryptocurrency, a consensual government limited by a social smart contract, an archipelago of crowdfunded physical territories, a virtual capital, and an on-chain census that proves a large enough population, income, and real-estate footprint to attain a measure of diplomatic recognition.

The "moral innovation" piece of Srinivasan's crypto-anarchist articulation underlies the goal of a network state. His motivation is to align ideologies more cohesively, disrupt political infighting, and institute a freer human future. Throughout the book, he expresses the problems with traditional nation states and emphasizes their territorial, coercive nature. In the section on nation states, he says, "(State) refers to the entity that governs these people, that commands the police and the military, and that holds the monopoly of violence over the geographic area that the nation inhabits."

In one prominent section, Srinivasan argues for a modern variation of Frederick Jackson Turner's Frontier Thesis. He makes the case that frontiers throughout history have been open, uncontested territories allowing exploration, experimentation, and settlement. In his modern take on the thesis, cyberspace represents the crypto-anarchist new frontier for social creativity and growth. It is only through these new frontiers, he claims, can people secure greater sovereignty and build saner, more voluntary governance mechanisms.

The Frontier Thesis is reminiscent of John Perry Barlow's famous, A Declaration of the Independence of Cyberspace, where he eschews the domination of nation states by comparing cyberspace to a frontier inhabited by the "virus" of freedom.

== Criticism ==
Some scholars criticize that crypto-anarchism is referencing the term "anarchism" in its regards to freedom as a primary value in them, whereas the political thoughts of crypto-anarchism are closer tied to libertarianism as to anarchism:

However, it is different in the case of crypto-anarchism. It is a thought and activity not based on anarchism of the turn of the 20th century, in which the idea of freedom had a social dimension. Freedom in anarchism of that time was treated as a value manifested in and towards other people, rather than in competition between individuals. Crypto-anarchism therefore has a different – libertarian – genesis, and libertarianism is not treated by social anarchists as anarchism. Nevertheless, the idea of freedom can be treated as a primary value in crypto-anarchism, and although it would be realised in the virtual world, it could also be realised in the real world.

== See also ==
- Jim Bell — originator of the idea of assassination politics
- Crypto Wars
- Computer security
- Technolibertarianism
- Cody Wilson
- Defense Distributed

== Works cited ==
- May, Timothy C. (1994), The Cyphernomicon, archived from the original on 22 August 2013
