= The Invisible Kingdom =

2022 book by Meghan O'Rourke

The Invisible Kingdom: Reimagining Chronic Illness
- Author: Meghan O'Rourke
- Language: English
- Publisher: Riverhead Books
- Publication date: 2021
- Publication place: United States
- Pages: 336
- ISBN: 9780399573309

The Invisible Kingdom: Reimagining Chronic Illness is a 2022 medical memoir by Meghan O'Rourke, published by Riverhead Books, an imprint of Penguin Random House. The memoir details O'Rourke's decade-long struggle with debilitating chronic illness and the medical system's inadequacy in properly diagnosing and treating her. O'Rourke initially documented her experience in a 2013 piece in The New Yorker titled "What's wrong with me?", and developed the narrative into a memoir. The book was a finalist for the 2022 National Book Award for Nonfiction.

== Narrative ==
The book documents O'Rourke's decade-long struggle with a chronic, debilitating illness that severely disabled her. She had myriad symptoms, including fatigue (often spending days in bed), brain fog, joint pains, cognitive impairment, and electrical pains in her legs. She explains how she struggled to carry on with her professional duties, including as editor of the Yale Review. O'Rourke writes that her healthcare providers were unable to provide a reliable diagnosis and discounted her symptoms, saying that she had somatization disorder. She details how her illness changed how she views herself, and how she reclaimed her identity through the redemptive efforts of documenting her illness. O'Rourke also details, through her own experiences and interviews with other people experiencing chronic illness, how the healthcare system is underprepared to diagnose and treat those with chronic illnesses, especially those without a clear cause. O'Rourke also documents some of the racial disparities in the U.S. healthcare system. Eventually, her illness was found to be due to Lyme Disease and an autoimmune disorder, her symptoms improved, and she was able to gain more independence.

== Reception ==
Writing for The New York Times, Andrew Solomon said that O'Rourke brought a new perspective to the now crowded genre of medical memoir: "She steers ably between the Scylla of cynicism and the Charybdis of romanticism, achieving an authentically original voice and, perhaps more startlingly, an authentically original perspective." Writing for the Los Angeles Times, Hillary Kelly said that the memoir, despite lingering too long on O'Rourke's daily symptoms and delving far too deep into technicalities about autoimmune diseases, is "a cultural history of 'one of the most powerful contemporary Western delusions: namely, the idea that we can control the outcomes of our lives'", calling the book "profound and almost soothing". Writing for The Nation, Libby Watson said that O'Rourke intimately portrays how having a chronic illness not easily explained by medical diagnostics, and not attracting empathy from others who may not have similar symptoms, can lead to feelings of isolation.
