= Robert E. Forsythe =

American economist

Robert E. Forsythe is an American economist. He is a former dean of the School of Business at Wayne State University in Detroit, Michigan. Prior to that, he was the dean of the school of business at the University of South Florida, in Tampa, Florida. He is a former professor and senior associate dean at the Henry B. Tippie College of Business at the University of Iowa in Iowa City, Iowa. He is also the founder of the Iowa Electronic Markets, an educational and research project that is an online futures market in which contract payoffs are based on real-world events.

== Education ==
Robert Forsythe graduated from the Pennsylvania State University in 1970 with a Bachelor of Science degree in quantitative business analysis. Afterwards, he studied at Carnegie Mellon University in Pittsburgh, Pennsylvania, where he earned a Master of Science degree in statistics in 1972, a Master of Science degree in economics in 1974, and a PhD in economics in 1975. That same year, he received the Alexander Henderson Award, presented to the student at the Tepper School of Business who displays the best work in the field of economic theory.

== Career ==
Before earning his PhD, Forsythe worked as an operations research analyst with PPG Industries. After earning his PhD., he taught at the California Institute of Technology in Pasadena, California, as well as the Tippie College of Business at the University of Iowa where he served simultaneously as the Leonard A. Hadley Chair in Leadership and senior associate dean.

Forsythe cofounded the Iowa Electronic Markets (IEM), which was designed as a futures market for trading in contracts on political and economic events over the Internet. The IEM attracted national attention forecasting election outcomes using financial markets and has been profiled by BusinessWeek, CNN, The Economist, Forbes, Good Morning America, the Wall Street Journal and the Washington Post. A recipient of numerous of professional awards, Forsythe has published more than 40 academic articles on accounting, economics, and finance; most focused on various issues in pricing assets.

In 2006, Forsythe moved from the University of Iowa to become the Dean of the College of Business at the University of South Florida in Tampa. He stepped down as dean in July 2012 but remained on the faculty at USF until June 2014. While at USF, he launched several student-centered initiatives, including the Bulls Business Community, the Financial Services Education Center, and the Business Communications Center.

In July 2014, Dr. Forsythe became dean of the School of Business Administration at Wayne State University. In October 2015, the school was renamed the Mike Ilitch School of Business in recognition of a $40 million naming gift from Mike and Marian Ilitch.
