= Bet2Give =

Online prediction market

Bet2Give.com was an online prediction market company started in 2007 by Émile Servan-Schreiber and Maurice Balick, as an offshoot to their NewsFutures. Bet2Give's premise was that having the winnings going automatically to a charity of the winner's choice wouldn't seriously interfere with the efficacy of the prediction market. Servan-Schreiber had conducted research a few years earlier into whether betting with "play money" reduced prediction market accuracy, with encouraging results.

The company offered typical prediction markets, such as betting on the outcomes of political races. It attracted some attention for featuring a bet on the Boeing 787 schedule slipping past the announced date.

The company attracted some praise, but also criticism, in particular for trendiness, with one commentator saying it reflected "the tendency to stick a gift to a non-profit into any other kind of financial transaction just to draw eyeballs to a site or customers to a store."
