= Policy Analysis Market =

Proposed futures prediction market

The Policy Analysis Market (PAM), part of the FutureMAP project, was a proposed futures exchange developed, beginning in May 2001, by the Information Awareness Office (IAO) of the United States Defense Advanced Research Projects Agency (DARPA), and based on an idea first proposed by Net Exchange, a San Diego, California, research firm specializing in the development of online prediction markets. PAM was shut down in August 2003 after multiple US senators condemned it as an assassination and terrorism market, a characterization criticized in turn by futures-exchange expert Robin Hanson of George Mason University, and several journalists. Since PAM's closure, several private-sector variations on the idea have been launched.

== Proposal ==
PAM was to be "a market in the future of the Middle East", and would have allowed trading of futures contracts based on possible political developments in several Middle Eastern countries. The theory behind such a market is that the monetary value of a futures contract on an event reflects the probability that that event will actually occur, since a market's actors rationally bid a contract either up or down based on reliable information. One of the models for PAM was a political futures market run by the University of Iowa, which had predicted US election outcomes more accurately than either opinion polls or political pundits. PAM was also inspired by the work of George Mason University economist Robin Hanson.

== Opposition ==
At a July 28, 2003, press conference, US Senators Byron L. Dorgan (D-ND) and Ron Wyden (D-OR) claimed that PAM would allow trading in such events as coups d'états, assassinations, and terrorist attacks, due to such events appearing on interface pictures on the project website. "On the web site, as a backdrop to bold text, were faint background sample screens. In a small (less than 2 percent) section of two such screens, Polk had included as colorful examples of possible miscellaneous items an assassination of Yasser Arafat, a missile attack by North Korea, and the overthrow of the king of Jordan."

They denounced the idea, with Wyden stating, "The idea of a federal betting parlor on atrocities and terrorism is ridiculous and it's grotesque", while Dorgan called it "useless, offensive and unbelievably stupid". Other critics offered similar outrage. Within less than a day, the Pentagon announced the cancellation of PAM, and by the end of the week John Poindexter, head of the DARPA unit responsible for developing it, had offered his resignation. He left a month later, on Aug. 13th, 2003, insisting his controversial anti-terrorist program was largely misunderstood.

PAM had first been proposed and funded in 2001, (Note: "DARPA's first call for proposals went out in May 2001 under the name "Electronic Market-Based Decision Support." The call basically said, 'We've heard this works elsewhere; show us it works for problems we care about.' Proposals were due in August, and by December two firms had won SBIR (small business independent research) grants.") Poindexter joined DARPA in December 2002, and Hanson claimed that Poindexter "actually had little involvement with PAM".

== Further developments ==
CNN reported the program would be relaunched by the private firm, Net Exchange, that helped create it, but that the newer version "will not include any securities based on forecasts of violent events such as assassinations or terror attacks".

On June 11, 2007, Popular Science launched a similar program, known as the PopSci Predictions Exchange. Another project was the American Action Market announced by Tad Hirsh of the MIT Media Lab in 2003, which would permit for-profit betting on major events.

There are now commercial policy-analysis markets that perform such functions. One, Intrade, had previously offered futures on events such as the capture of Osama bin Laden, the US Presidential Election, and the bombing of Iran. As of March 10, 2013, all trading had been suspended on Intrade's website due to undisclosed financial irregularities.

== See also ==
- Death pool (also "dead pool")
- Future Map and Information Awareness Office FutureMap Project
- The Wisdom of Crowds, a book which supported the Policy Analysis Market
- Dumb agent theory
- Polymarket
