= Meghan O'Rourke =

American writer (born 1976)

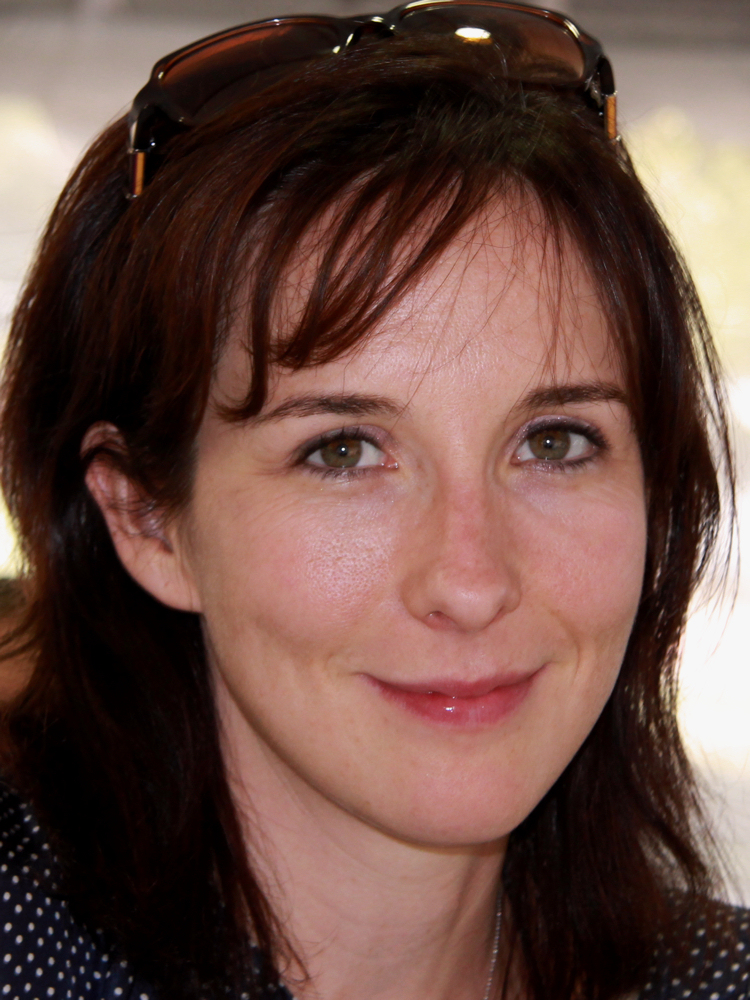
- Born: January 26, 1976 (age 50); New York City, New York, U.S.
- Education: Yale University (BA); Warren Wilson College (MFA)
- Spouse: James Surowiecki

Meghan O'Rourke (born 1976) is an American nonfiction writer, poet and critic.

== Background and education ==
O'Rourke was born on January 26, 1976, in Brooklyn, New York. The eldest of the three children of Paul and Barbara O'Rourke, she had two younger brothers. Her mother was a longtime teacher and administrator at Saint Ann's, an elite independent school in Brooklyn, and later headmaster of the Pierrepont School in Westport, Connecticut. Her father, a classicist and Egyptologist, also taught at Saint Ann's and Pierrepont. O'Rourke attended St. Ann's through high school. She earned a bachelor's of arts degree in English language and literature from Yale University in 1997 and a master of fine arts degree in poetry from Warren Wilson College in 2005.

== Career ==
=== Journalism ===
Immediately after graduating from Yale, O'Rourke began an internship as an editor at The New Yorker. She was promoted to fiction/nonfiction editor in 2000, becoming one of the youngest editors ever at the publication. During this time, she also freelanced as a contributing editor of the literary quarterly Grand Street. In 2002, O'Rourke moved to the online magazine Slate, serving as culture and literary editor until 2009 and as founding editor of DoubleX, a section of Slate that focused on women’s issues. She also continued to moonlight with other publications; from 2005 to 2010 she was a poetry coeditor of the Paris Review. She is also an occasional contributor to The New York Times. O'Rourke has written on a wide range of topics, including horse racing, gender bias in the literary world, the politics of marriage and divorce, and the place of grief and mourning in modern society. She has published poems in literary journals and magazines including The New Yorker, Best American Poetry, The New Republic, and Poetry, along with Perrine's Literatures Twelfth Edition.

O'Rourke's first book of poems, Halflife, was published by Norton in 2007. Her book The Long Goodbye, a memoir of grief and mourning written after her mother's death, was published to wide critical acclaim in 2011. On July 1, 2019, O'Rourke became editor of The Yale Review, coinciding with the 200th anniversary of its founding.

O'Rourke suffers from an autoimmune disorder that she has written about for The New Yorker. Her latest book, The Invisible Kingdom: Reimagining Chronic Illness, was released in March 2022. Publishers Weekly named it one of the top ten books of 2022, regardless of genre. O'Rourke has been treated for Lyme disease. The Invisible Kingdom details her decade-long struggle with it and with an autoimmune condition as well as the protracted process of obtaining a correct diagnosis. O'Rourke details how her symptoms were discounted by medical professionals, some of whom lacked empathy. The memoir is highly critical of the medical establishment, documenting its inadequacy in treating those with chronic medical conditions, especially those without a clear diagnosis. The memoir was nominated for the 2022 National Book Award for Nonfiction.

== Awards and fellowships ==
- 2005: Union League and Civic Arts Foundation Award from the Poetry Foundation
- 2007: Lannan Literary Award
- 2008: May Sarton Poetry Prize
- 2014: Guggenheim Award for General Nonfiction
- 2017: Whiting Creative Nonfiction Grant to complete her book, What's Wrong With Me? The Mysteries of Chronic Illness

== Bibliography ==
=== Poetry ===
Collections

- Halflife: poems. New York: W. W. Norton. 2007.
- Once: Poems (New York: W. W. Norton, 2011).
- Sun In Days (New York: W. W. Norton, 2017).

List of poems

| Title | Year | First published | Reprinted/collected |
|---|---|---|---|
| "Navesink" | 2017 | "Navesink". The New Yorker. Vol. 93, no. 4. March 13, 2017. p. 55. | |
| "My Life as a Subject" | 2008 | (June 2008). "My Life as a Subject". Poetry. 192: 200–4. | |
| "On Marriage" | 2008 | (June 2008). "On Marriage". Poetry. 192: 205. | |
| "Halflife" | 2005 | (September 2005). "Halflife". Poetry. 187: 411. | |
| "Sleep" | 2005 | (September 2005). "Sleep". Poetry. 187: 410. | |

=== Memoirs ===
- The Long Goodbye, memoir (New York: Riverhead, 2011).
- The Invisible Kingdom: Reimagining Chronic Illness, memoir (Riverhead Books, 2022).

=== Anthologies ===
- ed. A World Out of Reach: Dispatches from Life Under Lockdown (New Haven: Yale University Press, 2020)

== Sources ==
- Contemporary Authors Online. The Gale Group, 2006.
