= Countersignaling =

Social behaviour related to finance

Countersignaling is the behavior in which agents with the highest level of a given property invest less into proving it than individuals with a medium level of the same property. This concept is primarily useful for analyzing human behavior and thus relevant to signaling theory in economics, sociology and psychology.

For example, moderately wealthy individuals may conspicuously display luxury goods to signal their status, while extremely wealthy individuals might avoid such displays altogether, relying instead on subtler cues—or none at all—because their status is already well-known or inferred from other trusted sources.

== Signals and signaling theory ==
Much research is concerned with understanding what signals signalers should send to convince a receiver that they have a certain property, and what signals a receiver should be convinced by. One way of doing this is by putting money on the table just to prove that you can; someone without the property would not be able to do the same. For example, in biology peacocks expend energy on elaborate plumage that increase their risk of dying. By doing this they demonstrate their genetic fitness, as genetically less fit males can only grow small plumage, while genetically better individuals can grow larger ones (in biology, this is known as the handicap principle).

Countersignaling, by contrast, is showing off by not showing off, or by playing humble. For instance, the new money are eager to flaunt their wealth, and often surround themselves with expensive luxury items. Those with old money are more understated, preferring not to waste money on what they deem frivolities.

There are a number of different models that deal with this behavior and explain how rational individuals – those interested only in maximising certain utility – would find countersignaling beneficial. One of these is by Feltovich, Harbaugh and To. They developed a formal model in which receivers of signals judge the senders of signals based not only on what can be inferred from the signal sent, but also on additional information, which is assumed to be helpful but not perfect. For example, senders might be of low, medium, or high quality, and the additional information might be adequate for distinguishing low from high but not necessarily from distinguishing medium from low or high. Under certain circumstances, medium-quality senders will have an incentive to signal (to ensure that they can be distinguished from low-quality ones), but high-quality senders may not—they are not likely to be mistaken for low-quality senders in any case, and signaling behavior may mark them as medium.
