= Dead pool =

Game which involves guessing when someone will die

A dead pool, also known as a deadpool or death pool, is a game of prediction which involves guessing when someone will die. Sometimes it is a bet where money is involved.

== Modern application ==
In the early 20th century, dead pools were popular in dangerous sports such as motorsport, for example the first edition of the Indianapolis 500.

=== Variants ===
A modern dead pool typically has players choose celebrities they think will die within the year. Most begin on January 1 and run for 12 months, though variations exist.

In 2000, the website Fucked Company described itself as a "dot-com dead pool", inviting users to predict which Internet startups would fail during the dot com bust. The site folded in 2007 after years of being targeted by strategic lawsuits against public participation.

Because of the high body count in the first seven seasons of the popular fantasy television series Game of Thrones, dead pools were launched for its final season.

=== Modern dead pools ===
Websites including Derby Dead Pool and Rotten.com have hosted celebrity dead pools. Matt Sedensky described the practice in an AP News article: "Players scour newspapers and Web sites for news on celebrities' health; they rely on tips from insiders; and they consider a public figure's lifestyle, absence of recent appearances and rumors of illness."

== In popular culture ==
A dead pool is a key plot element of the 1988 final installment of the Dirty Harry film series, The Dead Pool. Harry investigates the players, when several people listed in a game of dead pool die in suspicious circumstances.

The Marvel Comics character Deadpool (first appearing in 1991) takes his name after escaping from Ajax and Dr. Killebrew, who formed their own dead pool based on which of their experimental subjects would die first. In the 2016 film Deadpool, the titular character takes his hero name from a dead pool of mercenaries, himself included, who are regular patrons at his favorite bar.

In the MTV show Teen Wolf, the main plotline of Season 4 (2014) revolves around a dead pool specifically targeting the supernaturals of Beacon Hills, which is set up by a mysterious character named The Benefactor.

== See also ==
- Assassination market
- Tontine
- Policy Analysis Market
