= Sheepskin effect =

Applied economics theory

The sheepskin effect (named for the vellum on which diplomas were traditionally written) is a phenomenon in applied economics observing that people possessing a completed academic degree earn a greater income than people who have an equivalent amount of studying without possessing an academic degree. There are many applied economics papers which investigate the signaling effect of possession of such an academic degree.

For example, if Student A is one credit short of a Bachelor's degree, while Student B has earned their Bachelor's degree, then the two students have essentially the same amount of education. However, according to the sheepskin effect, Student B will earn a greater income than Student A.

Research into the sheepskin effect can be divided into studies of explicit degree effects and, because many of the useful data sets don't explicitly report degrees, studies with no explicit degree measures. The latter typically use 12 years of education as a proxy for a high school diploma and 16 years as a proxy for a Bachelor's degree. A review of a quarter century of quantitative studies of both kinds finds consistent evidence of the sheepskin effect in all but a few studies. An analysis of data from the massive General Social Survey indicates that over 60% of the economic benefit of an education comes from the actual degree rather than the years or credits earned - especially in high school and college.
