= The Age of Em =

2016 book by Robin Hanson

The Age of Em: Work, Love and Life when Robots Rule the Earth
- First edition
- Author: Robin Hanson
- Language: English
- Publisher: Oxford University Press
- Publication date: 2016
- Pages: 528
- ISBN: 9780198754626

The Age of Em: Work, Love and Life when Robots Rule the Earth is a 2016 nonfiction book by economist Robin Hanson. It uses mainstream science to forecast a world dominated by whole brain emulations, or "ems".

== Summary ==
The book explores the implications of a future world in which researchers have not created artificial general intelligence but have learned to scan human brains and run them as software, producing emulated people who soon outnumber biological humans.

There have been three human eras so far, based on foraging, farming, and industry. The next era is likely to arise from artificial intelligence in the form of brain emulations, sometime in the next century or so. This book paints a detailed picture of this new era.

— The Age of Em

The book's main scenario proposes that sometime in roughly the next century, human brains will be scanned at "fine enough spatial and chemical resolution," and combined with good enough models of how brain cells process signals, "to create a cell-by-cell dynamically executable model of the full brain in artificial hardware, a model whose signal input-output behavior is usefully close to that of the original brain."

Hanson calls this a "baseline" scenario built by applying "today's standard academic consensus science" to the em premise. In it, ems live mostly in a few hot, dense cities and work largely in virtual reality. Cheap copying drives em wages to near subsistence. A typical em runs about a thousand times faster than a human, and most are short-lived "spurs" copied for one task. The economy might double monthly, so the era could last an objective year or two yet feel like millennia to ems. Biological humans retire on their investments in the em economy.

== Reception ==
In The Guardian, Steven Poole called the em world a "hellish cyberworld" but praised the book's "brilliantly weird extrapolations". Daniel Levitin of The Wall Street Journal admired its "perceptive analysis of our human past and present". Sarah O'Connor of the Financial Times found the book "crammed full of such fascinating visions" but said its brevity on rights and morality "does leave a hole".

Seth Baum reviewed the book in Futures. He commended the book for bringing a social science perspective, for the detail it gives, and for providing a starting point for further study. He also criticized some of the book's arguments and stated that different authors would reach different conclusions about the same topic.

Bryan Caplan called the forecast of monthly doubling the book's "single craziest claim" and argued that ems would be copies of the most docile, "robot-like" humans; Hanson rebutted both points. Steve Fuller called Hanson's image of humans kept as if in wildlife sanctuaries "trans-species paternalism".

== See also ==
- Mind uploading in fiction
- Mind uploading
