= James Surowiecki =

American journalist (b. 1967)

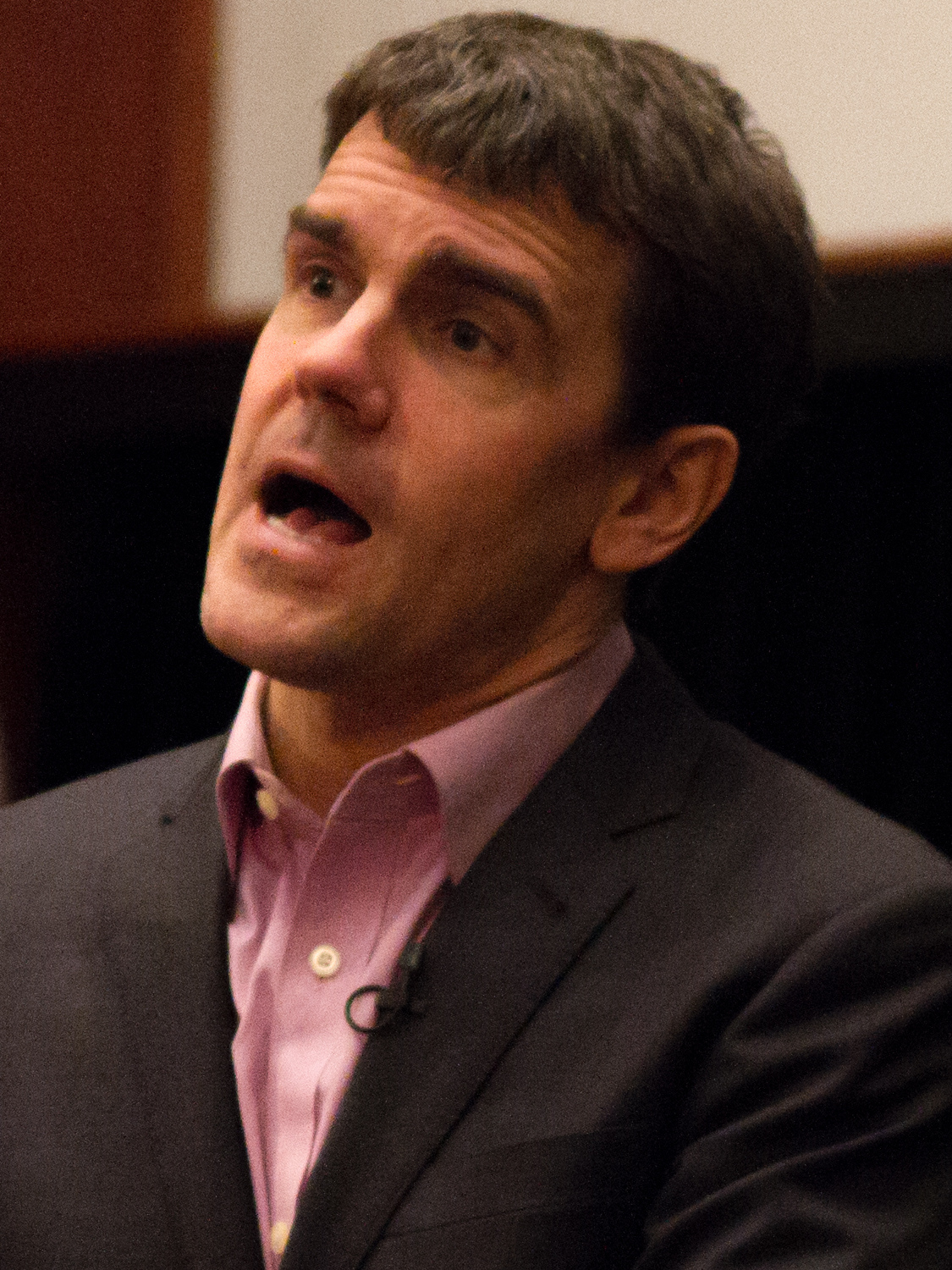
- Surowiecki in 2014
- Born: James Michael Surowiecki; April 30, 1967 (age 59); Meriden, Connecticut, U.S.
- Education: University of North Carolina, Chapel Hill (BA); Yale University (attended)
- Spouse: Meghan O'Rourke

James Michael Surowiecki (/ˌsʊəroʊˈwɪkiː/ SOOR-oh-WIK-ee; born April 30, 1967) is an American journalist. He was a staff writer at The New Yorker, where he wrote a regular column on business and finance called "The Financial Page".

== Background ==
Surowiecki was born in Meriden, Connecticut, and spent several childhood years in Mayagüez, Puerto Rico, where he received a junior high-school education from Southwestern Educational Society (SESO). He is a 1984 graduate of Choate Rosemary Hall and a 1988 alumnus of the University of North Carolina at Chapel Hill, where he was a Morehead Scholar. Surowiecki pursued PhD studies in American history on a Mellon Fellowship at Yale University from 1988 to 1995, but did not complete them. In 1995, he founded the now-defunct e-magazine Rogue and began a career in journalism. He lives in New Haven, Connecticut, and is married to The Yale Review editor Meghan O'Rourke.

== Career ==
Surowiecki's writing has appeared in a wide range of publications, including The New York Times, the Wall Street Journal, The Motley Fool, Foreign Affairs, Artforum, Wired, MIT Technology Review, and Slate.

Before joining The New Yorker, he wrote “The Bottom Line” column for New York magazine and was a contributing editor at Fortune.

He got his start on the Internet when he was hired from graduate school by Motley Fool co-founder David Gardner to be the Fool's editor-in-chief of its culture site on America Online, entitled "Rogue" (1995–1996). As The Motley Fool closed that site down and focused on finance, Surowiecki made the switch over to become a finance writer, which he did over the succeeding three years, including being assigned to write the Fool's column on Slate from 1997 to 2000.

In 2002, Surowiecki edited an anthology, Best Business Crime Writing of the Year, a collection of articles from different business news sources that chronicle the fall from grace of various CEOs. In 2004, he published The Wisdom of Crowds, in which he argued that, in some circumstances, large groups exhibit more intelligence than smaller, more elite groups, and that collective intelligence shapes business, economies, societies and nations. In an article in the Huffington Post in November 2013, Internet entrepreneur and researcher Neil Seeman drew on social media trends over the time since the publication of The Wisdom of Crowds to observe that Mr. Surowiecki had written his observations about collective intelligence "prior to the proliferation of Facebook and Twitter and 'social filtering'; today, online, we increasingly do not reach any wisdom of any independently-minded crowds. We speak to our friends."

Surowiecki is a contributing writer for The Atlantic. Surowiecki received wide public attention in April 2025 when he reverse engineered the numbers and figured out the math behind the tariffs that had been announced by the Trump administration on April 2, 2025.

== Bibliography ==
- Surowiecki, James (2004). The Wisdom of Crowds: Why the Many Are Smarter Than the Few and How Collective Wisdom Shapes Business, Economies, Societies and Nations. New York: Doubleday.
