= Tradesports =

Defunct web-based fantasy sports prediction game

- Industry: Fantasy sports
- Founded: 2014
- Founder: Ron Bernstein
- Headquarters: New York City, United States
- Website: www.tradesports.com

Tradesports.com was a web-based fantasy sports predictions game. Launched 2014, tradesports announced it was closing for business on November 30, 2015. Founded and re-launched by Ron Bernstein, the original founder and CEO of Intrade, Tradesports was a US based company with offices in New York City. Tradesports.com used proprietary trading technology originally developed by Intrade. Daily contests included all major sports in season like the MLB, the NFL, the NHL, the NBA, College Football and College Basketball.

Plans were announced for a re-launch in 2020, but ultimately fell through.

== Gameplay ==
Tradesports.com offered Fantasy Sports predicting with real money entry fees and real cash prizes.

Tradesports was a prediction market asking players to make YES or NO predictions about the outcomes of things that happen during sporting events, where the best predictors won. Different from traditional fantasy sports, Tradesports contests were based upon the teams and players fans know about. There were no drafts or rosters.

Tradesports.com users were able to participate and play for as little as $2 or up to $1,000, and each contest had pre-determined cash prizes.

Free-to-play contests were also available.

== Media coverage ==
Tradesports was featured in a wide range of publications including Business Insider, The New York Times and Forbes.

== See also ==
- Intrade
