= Future map (organizational planning) =

Method for building scenarios based on the collection of anticipated events

The future map is a method for building scenarios based on the collection of anticipated events.

The concept is based on the idea that a group of people who integrate the partial visions of its members into a common, shared, discussed, large enough, collection of anticipated events it can eventually reveal its own "shared future".

Because the FutureMap methodology is dynamic and implemented on a wiki-platform the Future projected by the group is constantly under revision. By process, the community learns how to adapt to future changes and increases its ability to face "unexpected events", it improves what the author calls its future-readiness.

== See also ==
- Policy Analysis Market and Information Awareness Office FutureMap Project
