= Intrade =

Web-based trading exchange

Intrade.com
- Founders: Ron Bernstein, Sean McNamara
- Fate: Defunct
- Products: Trading exchange
- Parent: Tradesports (2003-2004); Trade Exchange Network Limited (2004-2007); Intrade the Prediction Market Limited (2007-2014)
- Website: intrade.com

Intrade.com was a web-based prediction market which offered a platform where individuals could place bets on future outcomes. After having been forced to exclude US traders in 2012, on 10 March 2013 Intrade suspended all trading, citing possible "financial irregularities". For a time after the suspension, the intrade.com website stated that they were working on a relaunch of the site, called "Intrade 2.0", but as of August 2014 it states that "It appears very unlikely now that Intrade will resume trading services in the way it had operated previously", and announced plans to close all accounts and refund monies by 31 December 2014.

== History ==
Intrade was founded by Ron Bernstein and Sean McNamara, a New York futures and options floor trader, in 1999. Intrade was later acquired by Tradesports in 2003. John Delaney, the VP of Finance at Intrade, was appointed as the CEO of Tradesports during the acquisition of Intrade by Tradesports. In 2004, Tradesports was re-organized into Trade Exchange Network Limited (who operated the websites Intrade.com, Tradesports.com, WallStreetSports.com, Prediction-X.com and other websites using the Intrade trading platform and technology).

In 2007, Trade Exchange Network Limited was re-organized into three new corporate entities: Intrade the Prediction Market Limited (currently operating Intrade.com), Tradesports Ltd (previously operating Tradesports.com, which closed in 2008), and Prediction Exchange Services Limited, a technology company (which never initiated operations).

Intrade's system utilized a prediction market trading exchange which allows members to take positions (trade 'contracts') on whether future events will or will not occur. An example event is a political election, which is almost always settled in a well-defined and verifiable manner. The contract might be "Mitt Romney to win 2012 U.S. presidential election". Other possible events include financial predictions, such as "the NASDAQ Average to close higher today", or current events predictions such as "Will Adele win the Grammy Award for Best New Artist?" Intrade facilitates trading between members, charging a monthly fee, but does not participate in trading itself.

Trading positions are described in the common trading nomenclature of long (will happen—bullish) and short (will not happen—bearish). The trading unit is a contract with a notional settlement value of $0 if the event does not occur or $10 if the event does occur. The contract may trade in the range of 0–100, where 1 point equals US$0.10 in value. So, if the event specified in a given contract occurs, the contract settles at 100 points or $10; otherwise, the contract settles at 0 or $0 in value. Profits and losses are calculated by tabulating the differences between where contracts are purchased against where they are either sold (at any price set by the open market between 0 and 100) or what price they finally expire at (0 or 100) when the event itself is concluded. Utilizing this contract structure, the current price of a contract can be imputed as "the market's" global opinion of the probability that the specified event will occur.

Because events take place over a well-defined time span and have a well defined outcome, traders can trade both before and during an event.

Intrade provided both real-money and play-money prediction market trading. The minimum deposit for opening a real money account was US$25.00, but US$100 is recommended to "fully appreciate the trading experience".

While Intrade operated legally from the Republic of Ireland, it does not comment on the legality of trading for customers in other countries. In 2005, Tradesports applied to the U.S. Commodity Futures Trading Commission (CFTC) for permission to open a regulated futures exchange in the United States.

In July 2008, not having an official decision, Intrade sent a letter to the CFTC asking for clarification of the legal status of intrade.com and its executive leadership in the United States, saying "While Intrade serves a global community and has registered members from 162 countries, our 82,000 plus membership are predominantly resident in the United States ... it is perversely unclear as to whether Intrade, and indeed myself, are considered persona gratis by the United States."

Due to banking regulations that came into force in 2010, American customers were prohibited from funding their accounts with credit or debit cards issued by a US bank.

The 2012 US presidential election was a bellwether media event for Intrade, garnering the company high levels of web traffic (greater than 50 million monthly page views in October and November, source; Google Analytics) and hundreds of media mentions related to the accuracy of the Intrade markets and the correct market predictions of the outcomes of all US state electoral contests except Florida and Virginia.

On 26 November 2012, the CFTC filed a civil suit in federal district court in Washington, D.C. for unregulated trading in traditional commodities, such as gold, seeking an injunction against Intrade allowing U.S. citizens to trade on their site. The US CFTC claimed that Intrade's operation interfered with the CFTC's role "to police market activity and protect market integrity". Shortly thereafter (though not explicitly in direct response), Intrade announced it would no longer allow U.S. customers to participate in the real-money version of the site. On 23 December, Intrade closed all US-based member accounts. Trading volumes suffered a dramatic decrease without participation from US customers. On 10 March 2013, Intrade suspended all trading. In its announcement, the company stated that it was investigating potential financial irregularities.

== Contracts ==
Intrade allowed bets on a wide range of future outcomes: political events (in the US, India, Germany, Israel etc.), climate change, current events (bird flu, earthquakes etc.), entertainment (Academy Awards, American Idol, Dancing with the Stars), science (the observation of the Higgs boson), technology (web browser market share, Google Lunar X Prize, Apple iPad unit sales), finance (DJIA, S&P 500, NASDAQ-100, gold price), but did not predict stocks or sports competitions.

Intrade did however operate markets on sports-related events that did not involve athletic competition, such as bids to host an Olympics. Sister site intrade.net allowed the creation of custom markets.

Beginning in 2002, Intrade offered a range of markets for political events, such as the outcomes of U.S. presidential, senatorial, and gubernatorial elections, as well as for a diversified range of international political events.

== Disputes ==
While the vast majority of the thousands of markets listed have had easily verifiable outcomes, some have not, and disputes have arisen over the wording of some contracts.

In July 2006, TradeSports, (closed now, but previously related to Intrade), conceded that one of these contracts was problematic. The contract allowed speculation on whether North Korea would, by 31 July 2006, successfully fire ballistic missiles that would land outside its airspace. On 5 July 2006 the North Korean government claimed a successful test launch that would have satisfied the prediction, a launch widely reported by world media. Tradesports declared that the contract's conditions had not been met, because the US Department of Defense had not confirmed the action, and this confirmation was specifically required by the contract. (Other government sources had confirmed the claim, but these were not the sources referenced in the contract.) Traders considered this to be in strict compliance with the stated rule but contrary to the intention of the market (which was to predict the launch event, and not whether the US Defense Department would confirm it).

On 24 May 2011, it was announced that the CEO of Intrade, John Delaney, died while attempting to climb Mount Everest. Delaney died 50 meters from the summit. His body could not be recovered.

On 3 January 2012, Intrade settled contracts related to the 2012 Iowa caucus in favour of bettors supporting Mitt Romney, on the basis that Iowa Republican Party chairman Matt Strawn (incidentally a Rick Santorum supporter) had declared Romney to be the winner by a narrow margin of 8 votes, adding that there would be no recount. The contracts specified that

"Expiry will be based on the officially declared winner of the Iowa caucus, as reported by three independent and reliable media sources."

However, the normal process of certifying the vote count (not recount) revealed simple arithmetic errors which resulted in Santorum being declared the winner (by 34 votes) on 20 January. Intrade, having already paid out winnings to Romney supporters, maintained that its original decision had been correct, since at least three reliable media sources had reported a Romney victory.

== Market data ==
Intrade offered its market data to prediction market researchers. At one time it assisted the U.S. Department of Defense in a controversial scheme (ultimately cancelled) to assess probabilities of future terrorist attacks. Intrade supplies market data at significantly discounted fees or free to academics.

== See also ==
- Kalshi
- TradeSports
- Iowa Electronic Markets
- The Wisdom of Crowds
- PredictIt
- Augur (software)
