= Opinion polling and seat projections for the 2024 European Parliament election =

The European Parliament election was held between 6 and 9 June 2024. This article lists national polls for the European Union (EU) election as well as EU-wide seat projections and popular vote estimates.

== Polling aggregations ==
=== Seat projections ===
Europe Elects, Der Föderalist and Politico Europe have been presenting seat projections throughout the legislative period. Other institutes started presenting data during the election campaign. All projections make their national-level data transparent, except Politico Europe, which only presents aggregate EU-level data.

| Polling aggregator | | Date updated | Number of seats | The Left | S&D | G/EFA | Renew | EPP | ECR | ID | NI | Others |
|---|---|---|---|---|---|---|---|---|---|---|---|---|
| 2024 election | After reorganisation of groups | 16 July 2024 | 720 | 46 | 136 | 53 | 77 | 188 | 78 | 84 (as PfE) | 33+25 ESN | – |
| 2024 election | Dynamic (Note: Groups all parties not represented in the European Parliament into a group or non-inscrits.) (Note: Follows Europe Elects's assignment of parties into groups.) | 9 June 2024 | 720 | 40 | 136 | 54 | 80 | 188 | 82 | 64 | 76 | – |
| 2024 election | Baseline (Note: Groups all parties not represented in the European Parliament into "others", unless it is a member of a political party at the European level.) | 9 June 2024 | 720 | 39 | 136 | 54 | 78 | 177 | 73 | 58 | 48 | 67 |
| PolitPro | | 9 June 2024 | 720 | 40 | 139 | 40 | 81 | 174 | 74 | 89 | 43 | 40 |
| Politico Europe | | 6 June 2024 | 720 | 32 | 143 | 41 | 75 | 173 | 76 | 67 | 58 | 55 |
| election.de | | 6 June 2024 | 720 | 42 | 138 | 58 | 85 | 181 | 82 | 69 | 65 | – |
| Cassandra-odds.com | | 5 June 2024 | 720 | 38 | 145 | 57 | 89 | 167 | 84 | 73 | 67 | – |
| euobserver | | 5 June 2024 | 720 | 43 | 140 | 52 | 79 | 178 | 89 | 63 | 76 | – |
| Europe Elects | | 4 June 2024 | 720 | 38 | 136 | 55 | 81 | 182 | 79 | 69 | 76 | 4 |
| Der Föderalist | Baseline | 3 Jun 2024 | 720 | 37 | 136 | 57 | 81 | 172 | 79 | 66 | 50 | 42 |
| Der Föderalist | Dynamic | 3 Jun 2024 | 720 | 40 | 137 | 58 | 85 | 186 | 80 | 78 | 56 | – |
| Euronews | | 23 May 2024 | 720 | 43 | 135 | 54 | 82 | 181 | 80 | 83 | 62 | – |
| 2019 election | After Brexit | 1 Feb 2020 | 705 | 40 | 148 | 67 | 97 | 187 | 62 | 76 | 28 | – |
| 2019 election | Before Brexit | 26 May 2019 | 751 | 41 | 154 | 74 | 108 | 182 | 62 | 73 | 57 | – |

=== Popular vote projections ===
Europe Elects has been presenting popular vote projections throughout the legislative period. Other institutes started presenting data during the election campaign.

| Polling aggregator | | Date updated | The Left | S&D | G/EFA | Renew | EPP | ECR | ID | NI | Others |
|---|---|---|---|---|---|---|---|---|---|---|---|
| 2024 election | | 9 June 2024 | 6.7 % | 19.2 % | 8.8 % | 10.4 % | 21.2 % | 12.3 % | 9.0 % | 9.0 % | 3.4 % |
| PolitPro | | 9 June 2024 | 5.6% | 19.3% | 5.6% | 11.3% | 24.2% | 10.3% | 12.4% | 6.0% | 5.3% |
| The Economist | | 9 June 2024 | 6.0% | 16.0% | 6.0% | 10.0% | 22.0% | 10.0% | 9.0% | 7.0% | 14.0% |
| Europe Elects | | 31 May 2024 | 6.4% | 19.8% | 7.7% | 11.2% | 21.1% | 12.2% | 8.5% | 8.9% | 4.2% |
2019 election
| 2019 election | Before Brexit | 26 May 2019 | 6.5% | 18.5% | 11.7% | 13.0% | 21.0% | 8.2% | 10.8% | 7.2% | 3.1% |

== Seats ==
361 seats are needed for an absolute majority in the European Parliament.

| Organisation | Release date | Area | Number of seats | The Left | S&D | G/EFA | Renew | EPP | ECR | ID | NI | Others | Lead |
|---|---|---|---|---|---|---|---|---|---|---|---|---|---|
| election.de | 6 June 2024 | EU27 | 720 | 42 | 138 | 58 | 85 | 181 | 82 | 69 | 65 | | 43 |
| Europe Elects for EURACTIV | 4 June 2024 | EU27 | 720 | 38 | 136 | 55 | 81 | 182 | 79 | 69 | 76 | 4 | 46 |
| election.de | 30 May 2024 | EU27 | 720 | 43 | 141 | 57 | 84 | 179 | 81 | 68 | 67 | | 38 |
| Europe Elects for EURACTIV | 27 May 2024 | EU27 | 720 | 39 | 138 | 56 | 86 | 180 | 75 | 68 | 76 | 2 | 42 |
| | 23 May 2024 | Germany's AfD is expelled from the Identity and Democracy (ID) group. | | | | | | | | | | | |
| election.de | 23 May 2024 | EU27 | 720 | 43 | 139 | 56 | 87 | 179 | 83 | 80 | 53 | | 40 |
| Europe Elects for EURACTIV | 16 May 2024 | EU27 | 720 | 43 | 134 | 54 | 85 | 182 | 83 | 83 | 54 | 2 | 48 |
| election.de | 9 May 2024 | EU27 | 720 | 40 | 140 | 55 | 89 | 177 | 80 | 84 | 55 | | 37 |
| Europe Elects for EURACTIV | 28 Apr 2024 | EU27 | 720 | 44 | 140 | 48 | 86 | 183 | 86 | 84 | 48 | 1 | 43 |
| EM Analytics | 30 April 2024 | EU27 | 720 | 40 | 139 | 55 | 85 | 176 | 84 | 79 | 62 | | 37 |
| Der Föderalist | 26 Apr 2024 | EU27 | 720 | 35 | 132 | 51 | 86 | 173 | 81 | 83 | 35 | 44 | 41 |
| Der Föderalist | 26 Apr 2024 | EU27 | 720 | 39 | 134 | 53 | 89 | 181 | 86 | 99 | 39 | | 47 |
| EM Analytics | 22 Apr 2024 | EU27 | 720 | 39 | 139 | 51 | 86 | 181 | 86 | 77 | 61 | | 42 |
| election.de | 22 Apr 2024 | EU27 | 720 | 39 | 138 | 52 | 90 | 173 | 80 | 87 | 61 | | 35 |
| Europe Elects for EURACTIV | 16 Apr 2024 | EU27 | 720 | 40 | 139 | 52 | 84 | 184 | 82 | 84 | 52 | 3 | 45 |
| election.de | 8 Apr 2024 | EU27 | 720 | 39 | 138 | 55 | 86 | 176 | 81 | 85 | 60 | | 38 |
| Europe Elects for EURACTIV | 28 Mar 2024 | EU27 | 720 | 47 | 135 | 52 | 87 | 184 | 81 | 82 | 48 | 4 | 49 |
| election.de | 22 Mar 2024 | EU27 | 720 | 40 | 139 | 54 | 89 | 176 | 84 | 83 | 55 | | 37 |
| Ipsos for Euronews | 19 Mar 2024 | EU27 | 720 | 42 | 136 | 55 | 85 | 177 | 76 | 81 | 68 | | 41 |
| Europe Elects for EURACTIV | 18 Mar 2024 | EU27 | 720 | 46 | 135 | 50 | 86 | 183 | 84 | 89 | 43 | 4 | 48 |
| Politico Europe | 9 Mar 2024 | EU27 | 720 | 33 | 141 | 48 | 90 | 180 | 87 | 89 | 52 | | 39 |
| election.de | 8 Mar 2024 | EU27 | 720 | 39 | 142 | 51 | 86 | 171 | 86 | 86 | 59 | | 29 |
| Europe Elects for EURACTIV | 1 Mar 2024 | EU27 | 720 | 45 | 140 | 49 | 82 | 181 | 83 | 92 | 44 | 4 | 41 |
| Der Föderalist | 26 Feb 2024 | EU27 | 720 | 35 | 135 | 48 | 85 | 176 | 78 | 85 | 36 | 42 | 41 |
| Der Föderalist | 26 Feb 2024 | EU27 | 720 | 37 | 137 | 48 | 89 | 183 | 82 | 101 | 43 | | 46 |
| Europe Elects for EURACTIV | 19 Feb 2024 | EU27 | 720 | 44 | 140 | 48 | 85 | 180 | 83 | 92 | 43 | 6 | 40 |
| election.de | 7 Feb 2024 | EU27 | 720 | 42 | 138 | 49 | 78 | 176 | 88 | 94 | 55 | | 38 |
| Europe Elects for EURACTIV | 1 Feb 2024 | EU27 | 720 | 42 | 140 | 51 | 82 | 180 | 80 | 91 | 49 | 5 | 40 |
| ECFR | 23 Jan 2024 | EU27 | 720 | 44 | 131 | 61 | 86 | 173 | 85 | 98 | 42 | | 42 |
| Europe Elects for EURACTIV | 15 Jan 2024 | EU27 | 720 | 37 | 143 | 50 | 84 | 178 | 80 | 93 | 49 | 6 | 35 |
| election.de | 9 Jan 2024 | EU27 | 720 | 41 | 141 | 45 | 80 | 179 | 86 | 95 | 53 | | 38 |
| Politico Europe | 9 Jan 2024 | EU27 | 720 | 33 | 145 | 43 | 86 | 178 | 89 | 96 | 50 | | 33 |
| Der Föderalist | 8 Jan 2024 | EU27 | 720 | 33 | 141 | 45 | 86 | 169 | 75 | 89 | 43 | 39 | 28 |
| Der Föderalist | 8 Jan 2024 | EU27 | 720 | 35 | 143 | 47 | 91 | 177 | 85 | 108 | 34 | | 34 |
| Europe Elects | 30 Dec 2023 | EU27 | 720 | 36 | 142 | 49 | 84 | 179 | 81 | 93 | 50 | 6 | 37 |
| Politico Europe | 11 Dec 2023 | EU27 | 720 | 33 | 145 | 47 | 87 | 175 | 91 | 91 | 51 | | 30 |
| Europe Elects | 30 Nov 2023 | EU27 | 720 | 38 | 141 | 52 | 89 | 175 | 82 | 87 | 52 | 4 | 35 |
| KAS | 29 Nov 2023 | EU27 | 720 | 42 | 143 | 48 | 87 | 171 | 78 | 79 | 41 | 30 | 35 |
| Politico Europe | 9 Nov 2023 | EU27 | 720 | 38 | 143 | 49 | 91 | 179 | 90 | 85 | 45 | | 36 |
| Der Föderalist | 6 Nov 2023 | EU27 | 720 | 43 | 137 | 43 | 90 | 170 | 78 | 76 | 37 | 45 | 33 |
| Der Föderalist | 6 Nov 2023 | EU27 | 720 | 46 | 138 | 47 | 96 | 178 | 89 | 92 | 34 | | 40 |
| Europe Elects | 31 Oct 2023 | EU27 | 720 | 45 | 139 | 51 | 92 | 173 | 80 | 76 | 53 | 11 | 34 |
| | 12 Oct 2023 | PES (S&D's party) suspends Slovakia's Smer–SD and Hlas–SD due to their coalition with the sovereignist SNS party. | | | | | | | | | | | |
| Politico Europe | 9 Oct 2023 | EU27 | 720 | 40 | 151 | 49 | 89 | 172 | 93 | 82 | 44 | | 21 |
| Europe Elects | 30 Sep 2023 | EU27 | 720 | 43 | 145 | 52 | 90 | 165 | 86 | 74 | 56 | 10 | 21 |
| | 22 Sep 2023 | The European Council approves the new apportionment in the European Parliament from 705 to 720 seats. | | | | | | | | | | | |
| Der Föderalist | 11 Sep 2023 | EU27 | 720 | 43 | 147 | 46 | 91 | 162 | 77 | 74 | 36 | 43 | 15 |
| Der Föderalist | 11 Sep 2023 | EU27 | 720 | 45 | 147 | 50 | 96 | 171 | 90 | 89 | 32 | | 24 |
| Der Föderalist | 11 Sep 2023 | EU27 | 705 | 42 | 144 | 46 | 90 | 157 | 77 | 72 | 35 | 41 | 13 |
| Der Föderalist | 11 Sep 2023 | EU27 | 705 | 44 | 144 | 50 | 95 | 165 | 89 | 87 | 31 | | 21 |
| Politico Europe | 7 Sep 2023 | EU27 | 705 | 42 | 146 | 46 | 91 | 167 | 93 | 76 | 44 | | 21 |
| Europe Elects | 31 Aug 2023 | EU27 | 720 | 38 | 149 | 53 | 90 | 164 | 83 | 75 | 58 | 10 | 15 |
| Politico Europe | 9 Aug 2023 | EU27 | 705 | 45 | 145 | 48 | 89 | 165 | 89 | 77 | 47 | | 20 |
| Europe Elects | 31 Jul 2023 | EU27 | 705 | 45 | 143 | 49 | 90 | 157 | 82 | 82 | 55 | 12 | 14 |
| Der Föderalist | 17 Jul 2023 | EU27 | 705 | 41 | 136 | 48 | 94 | 160 | 79 | 70 | 36 | 41 | 24 |
| Der Föderalist | 17 Jul 2023 | EU27 | 705 | 43 | 137 | 52 | 99 | 167 | 89 | 87 | 31 | | 30 |
| Der Föderalist | 22 May 2023 | EU27 | 705 | 49 | 137 | 50 | 92 | 162 | 79 | 67 | 33 | 36 | 25 |
| Der Föderalist | 22 May 2023 | EU27 | 705 | 50 | 137 | 54 | 99 | 172 | 82 | 83 | 28 | | 35 |
| Europe Elects | 28 Apr 2023 | EU27 | 705 | 51 | 141 | 49 | 89 | 163 | 85 | 64 | 51 | 11 | 22 |
| Der Föderalist | 27 Mar 2023 | EU27 | 705 | 44 | 137 | 42 | 94 | 162 | 78 | 68 | 38 | 42 | 25 |
| Der Föderalist | 27 Mar 2023 | EU27 | 705 | 46 | 141 | 46 | 102 | 170 | 81 | 84 | 35 | | 29 |
| Der Föderalist | 1 Feb 2023 | EU27 | 705 | 50 | 135 | 42 | 96 | 168 | 78 | 65 | 37 | 34 | 33 |
| Der Föderalist | 1 Feb 2023 | EU27 | 705 | 52 | 138 | 47 | 103 | 172 | 82 | 80 | 31 | | 34 |
| Der Föderalist | 6 Dec 2022 | EU27 | 705 | 51 | 136 | 44 | 93 | 166 | 79 | 64 | 37 | 35 | 30 |
| Der Föderalist | 6 Dec 2022 | EU27 | 705 | 53 | 139 | 50 | 100 | 170 | 83 | 80 | 30 | | 31 |
| Europe Elects | 7 Dec 2022 | EU27 | 705 | 49 | 142 | 56 | 100 | 158 | 84 | 63 | 46 | 7 | 16 |
| Europe Elects | 1 Nov 2022 | EU27 | 705 | 55 | 135 | 53 | 106 | 162 | 81 | 66 | 41 | 6 | 27 |
| Der Föderalist | 12 Oct 2022 | EU27 | 705 | 52 | 127 | 42 | 100 | 169 | 79 | 63 | 35 | 38 | 42 |
| Der Föderalist | 12 Oct 2022 | EU27 | 705 | 54 | 130 | 48 | 108 | 174 | 84 | 80 | 27 | | 44 |
| Der Föderalist | 20 Aug 2022 | EU27 | 705 | 52 | 134 | 47 | 98 | 170 | 75 | 63 | 27 | 39 | 36 |
| Der Föderalist | 20 Aug 2022 | EU27 | 705 | 54 | 137 | 53 | 107 | 175 | 80 | 76 | 23 | | 38 |
| Der Föderalist | 22 Jun 2022 | EU27 | 705 | 54 | 133 | 44 | 101 | 165 | 77 | 64 | 31 | 36 | 32 |
| Der Föderalist | 22 Jun 2022 | EU27 | 705 | 56 | 136 | 54 | 106 | 168 | 81 | 79 | 25 | | 32 |
| Der Föderalist | 25 Apr 2022 | EU27 | 705 | 59 | 139 | 39 | 97 | 157 | 78 | 64 | 37 | 35 | 18 |
| Der Föderalist | 25 Apr 2022 | EU27 | 705 | 60 | 143 | 49 | 102 | 159 | 84 | 76 | 32 | | 16 |
| Der Föderalist | 1 Mar 2022 | EU27 | 705 | 53 | 139 | 36 | 98 | 158 | 78 | 62 | 45 | 36 | 19 |
| Der Föderalist | 1 Mar 2022 | EU27 | 705 | 55 | 142 | 44 | 105 | 160 | 109 | 62 | 28 | | 18 |
| Europe Elects | 8 Jan 2022 | EU27 | 705 | 49 | 152 | 55 | 99 | 158 | 78 | 62 | 35 | 17 | 6 |
| Der Föderalist | 4 Jan 2022 | EU27 | 705 | 51 | 142 | 39 | 99 | 165 | 73 | 62 | 34 | 40 | 23 |
| Der Föderalist | 4 Jan 2022 | EU27 | 705 | 53 | 146 | 43 | 105 | 166 | 102 | 62 | 28 | | 20 |
| Europe Elects | 7 Dec 2021 | EU27 | 705 | 50 | 155 | 55 | 103 | 146 | 81 | 75 | 36 | 4 | 9 |
| Der Föderalist | 8 Nov 2021 | EU27 | 705 | 50 | 144 | 42 | 96 | 155 | 75 | 72 | 36 | 35 | 11 |
| Der Föderalist | 8 Nov 2021 | EU27 | 705 | 52 | 148 | 48 | 107 | 156 | 23 | 120 | 51 | | 8 |
| Europe Elects | 4 Nov 2021 | EU27 | 705 | 50 | 155 | 51 | 102 | 151 | 81 | 75 | 35 | 5 | 4 |
| Europe Elects | 8 Oct 2021 | EU27 | 705 | 50 | 154 | 47 | 94 | 156 | 78 | 75 | 36 | 15 | 2 |
| Der Föderalist | 13 Sep 2021 | EU27 | 705 | 54 | 141 | 42 | 98 | 160 | 70 | 75 | 33 | 32 | 19 |
| Der Föderalist | 13 Sep 2021 | EU27 | 705 | 56 | 145 | 48 | 107 | 160 | 22 | 116 | 51 | | 15 |
| Der Föderalist | 21 Jul 2021 | EU27 | 705 | 52 | 133 | 45 | 97 | 167 | 71 | 74 | 31 | 35 | 34 |
| Der Föderalist | 21 Jul 2021 | EU27 | 705 | 54 | 138 | 49 | 108 | 168 | 23 | 117 | 48 | | 30 |
| Europe Elects | 9 Jul 2021 | EU27 | 705 | 52 | 144 | 55 | 94 | 156 | 75 | 77 | 34 | 18 | 12 |
| Europe Elects | 5 Jun 2021 | EU27 | 705 | 51 | 146 | 58 | 92 | 155 | 76 | 74 | 35 | 18 | 9 |
| Der Föderalist | 24 May 2021 | EU27 | 705 | 50 | 125 | 50 | 95 | 167 | 74 | 73 | 33 | 38 | 42 |
| Der Föderalist | 24 May 2021 | EU27 | 705 | 52 | 130 | 54 | 109 | 167 | 87 | 74 | 32 | | 37 |
| Europe Elects | 2 May 2021 | EU27 | 705 | 52 | 144 | 56 | 93 | 158 | 75 | 74 | 34 | 19 | 14 |
| Europe Elects | 2 Apr 2021 | EU27 | 705 | 51 | 151 | 52 | 93 | 159 | 74 | 74 | 32 | 19 | 8 |
| Der Föderalist | 29 Mar 2021 | EU27 | 705 | 52 | 136 | 46 | 96 | 164 | 71 | 73 | 34 | 33 | 28 |
| Der Föderalist | 29 Mar 2021 | EU27 | 705 | 54 | 141 | 49 | 109 | 164 | 85 | 73 | 30 | | 23 |
| | 3 Mar 2021 | Hungary's Fidesz party leaves the EPP Group. | | | | | | | | | | | |
| Der Föderalist | 2 Feb 2021 | EU27 | 705 | 52 | 135 | 45 | 94 | 184 | 70 | 71 | 21 | 33 | 49 |
| Der Föderalist | 2 Feb 2021 | EU27 | 705 | 53 | 141 | 48 | 107 | 184 | 73 | 71 | 28 | | 49 |
| Europe Elects | 5 Jan 2021 | EU27 | 705 | 55 | 138 | 47 | 97 | 190 | 73 | 72 | 22 | 11 | 52 |
| Der Föderalist | 9 Dec 2020 | EU27 | 705 | 52 | 136 | 47 | 93 | 188 | 67 | 73 | 20 | 29 | 52 |
| Der Föderalist | 9 Dec 2020 | EU27 | 705 | 53 | 140 | 40 | 103 | 188 | 73 | 73 | 25 | | 48 |
| Europe Elects | 2 Dec 2020 | EU27 | 705 | 55 | 136 | 48 | 95 | 195 | 68 | 73 | 23 | 12 | 59 |
| Europe Elects | 31 Oct 2020 | EU27 | 705 | 54 | 136 | 48 | 93 | 197 | 70 | 74 | 24 | 9 | 61 |
| Der Föderalist | 12 Oct 2020 | EU27 | 705 | 51 | 127 | 49 | 96 | 193 | 67 | 71 | 21 | 30 | 66 |
| Der Föderalist | 12 Oct 2020 | EU27 | 705 | 52 | 136 | 52 | 102 | 193 | 71 | 71 | 28 | – | 57 |
| Europe Elects | 4 Oct 2020 | EU27 | 705 | 55 | 136 | 49 | 95 | 195 | 71 | 77 | 23 | 4 | 59 |
| Europe Elects | 31 Aug 2020 | EU27 | 705 | 55 | 134 | 49 | 96 | 196 | 71 | 75 | 24 | 5 | 62 |
| Europe Elects | 14 Aug 2020 | EU27 | 705 | 54 | 134 | 49 | 97 | 198 | 70 | 75 | 23 | 5 | 64 |
| Europe Elects | 24 Jul 2020 | EU27 | 705 | 54 | 133 | 48 | 97 | 198 | 71 | 77 | 24 | 3 | 65 |
| Europe Elects | 28 May 2020 | EU27 | 705 | 55 | 135 | 47 | 98 | 197 | 70 | 77 | 23 | 3 | 62 |
| Europe Elects | 30 Apr 2020 | EU27 | 705 | 55 | 140 | 46 | 94 | 193 | 72 | 78 | 23 | 4 | 53 |
| Europe Elects | 31 Mar 2020 | EU27 | 705 | 57 | 135 | 51 | 92 | 188 | 72 | 83 | 21 | 6 | 53 |
| Europe Elects | 29 Feb 2020 | EU27 | 705 | 56 | 133 | 55 | 99 | 184 | 68 | 85 | 21 | 6 | 51 |
| Europe Elects | 31 Jan 2020 | EU27 | 705 | 55 | 130 | 53 | 101 | 182 | 70 | 85 | 23 | 6 | 52 |
| | 31 Jan 2020 | The United Kingdom leaves the European Union. | | | | | | | | | | | |
| Europe Elects | 31 Dec 2019 | EU27 | 705 | 54 | 131 | 52 | 102 | 182 | 70 | 86 | 25 | 3 | 51 |
| Europe Elects | 31 Dec 2019 | EU28 | 751 | 53 | 153 | 52 | 103 | 177 | 103 | 82 | 25 | 3 | 24 |
| Europe Elects | 30 Nov 2019 | EU28 | 751 | 49 | 157 | 61 | 107 | 176 | 95 | 80 | 25 | 1 | 19 |
| Europe Elects | 31 Aug 2019 | EU28 | 751 | 46 | 151 | 62 | 115 | 175 | 92 | 78 | 30 | 2 | 24 |
| Europe Elects | 30 Sep 2019 | EU28 | 751 | 48 | 151 | 63 | 118 | 170 | 87 | 79 | 32 | 3 | 19 |
| Europe Elects | 31 Aug 2019 | EU28 | 751 | 47 | 154 | 64 | 116 | 166 | 89 | 80 | 32 | 3 | 12 |
| Europe Elects | 31 Jul 2019 | EU28 | 751 | 48 | 153 | 65 | 117 | 168 | 85 | 79 | 33 | 3 | 15 |
| Europe Elects | 30 Jun 2019 | EU28 | 751 | 46 | 145 | 74 | 119 | 167 | 64 | 80 | 54 | 2 | 22 |
| Redistribution of seats after Brexit | 1 Feb 2020 | EU27 | 705 | 40 | 148 | 68 | 97 | 187 | 62 | 76 | 27 | – | 39 |
| 2019 European Parliament election | 26 May 2019 | EU28 | 751 | 41 | 154 | 74 | 108 | 182 | 62 | 73 | 57 | – | 28 |

== Popular vote ==
The following table shows the projected popular vote share for the groups in the EU Parliament aggregated on the European level. EU27 excludes the United Kingdom in this context. EU28 includes the United Kingdom.

| Organisation | Release date | Area | The Left | S&D | G/EFA | Renew | EPP | ECR | ID | NI | Others | Lead |
|---|---|---|---|---|---|---|---|---|---|---|---|---|
| | 23 May 2024 | Germany's AfD is expelled from the Identity and Democracy group. | | | | | | | | | | |
| EM Analytics | 30 Apr 2024 | EU27 | 7.3% | 18.9% | 7.5% | 10.0% | 21.7% | 10.9% | 12.0% | 6.8% | 5.0% | 2.8% |
| Europe Elects for Euractiv | 28 Apr 2024 | EU27 | 6.3% | 18.3% | 7.7% | 9.9% | 22.9% | 11.8% | 11.2% | 6.6% | 5.2% | 4.6% |
| EM Analytics | 22 Apr 2024 | EU27 | 7.0% | 18.5% | 7.9% | 10.3% | 22.0% | 11.1% | 12.1% | 6.7% | 4.6% | 3.5% |
| Europe Elects for Euractiv | 16 Apr 2024 | EU27 | 5.9% | 18.0% | 7.6% | 10.4% | 24.3% | 11.0% | 10.9% | 6.5% | 5.4% | 6.3% |
| Europe Elects for Euractiv | 28 Mar 2024 | EU27 | 7.7% | 18.4% | 8.1% | 10.6% | 23.0% | 11.2% | 11.2% | 6.0% | 3.8% | 4.6% |
| Europe Elects for Euractiv | 18 Mar 2024 | EU27 | 4.8% | 18.5% | 8.1% | 10.4% | 22.2% | 11.1% | 11.6% | 7.3% | 6.1% | 3.7% |
| Europe Elects for Euractiv | 1 Mar 2024 | EU27 | 5.5% | 18.9% | 7.3% | 9.5% | 22.6% | 11.6% | 11.7% | 7.4% | 5.2% | 3.7% |
| Europe Elects for Euractiv | 19 Feb 2024 | EU27 | 6.7% | 18.5% | 7.3% | 9.7% | 22.9% | 11.3% | 11.4% | 7.1% | 5.0% | 4.4% |
| Europe Elects for Euractiv | 1 Feb 2024 | EU27 | 6.8% | 18.4% | 6.9% | 9.5% | 22.6% | 11.3% | 12.3% | 5.9% | 6.2% | 4.2% |
| Europe Elects for Euractiv | 15 Jan 2024 | EU27 | 5.9% | 18.3% | 6.8% | 10.3% | 23.5% | 10.9% | 12.5% | 6.1% | 5.5% | 5.2% |
| Europe Elects | 30 Dec 2023 | EU27 | 5.5% | 17.9% | 7.0% | 10.4% | 22.8% | 11.1% | 12.1% | 6.2% | 6.9% | 4.9% |
| Europe Elects | 30 Nov 2023 | EU27 | 5.7% | 18.4% | 7.2% | 10.7% | 22.4% | 11.0% | 11.7% | 6.1% | 6.7% | 4.0% |
| Europe Elects | 31 Oct 2023 | EU27 | 5.9% | 18.5% | 7.5% | 10.5% | 22.4% | 11.3% | 11.3% | 6.1% | 6.5% | 3.9% |
| Europe Elects | 30 Sep 2023 | EU27 | 6.9% | 19.1% | 7.0% | 9.9% | 21.3% | 11.8% | 10.8% | 6.0% | 7.0% | 2.2% |
| Europe Elects | 31 Aug 2023 | EU27 | 6.1% | 19.5% | 7.1% | 10.2% | 21.6% | 11.8% | 10.5% | 6.0% | 7.0% | 2.1% |
| Europe Elects | 31 Jul 2023 | EU27 | 7.2% | 19.5% | 6.9% | 10.5% | 20.6% | 11.5% | 10.6% | 6.4% | 6.7% | 1.1% |
| Europe Elects | 28 Jun 2023 | EU27 | 6.9% | 18.7% | 7.0% | 10.4% | 21.4% | 11.7% | 10.5% | 6.3% | 7.1% | 2.7% |
| Europe Elects | 31 May 2023 | EU27 | 7.5% | 18.8% | 6.9% | 10.8% | 20.7% | 11.7% | 9.6% | 6.1% | 7.6% | 1.9% |
| Europe Elects | 30 Apr 2023 | EU27 | 7.8% | 18.2% | 7.0% | 10.4% | 21.4% | 11.6% | 9.6% | 6.0% | 7.8% | 3.2% |
| Europe Elects | 31 Mar 2023 | EU27 | 7.3% | 19.0% | 7.3% | 11.1% | 21.6% | 11.4% | 9.0% | 6.0% | 7.1% | 2.6% |
| Europe Elects | 28 Feb 2023 | EU27 | 7.1% | 18.7% | 7.3% | 11.1% | 21.7% | 11.5% | 9.2% | 6.0% | 7.2% | 3.0% |
| Europe Elects | 31 Jan 2023 | EU27 | 7.4% | 18.5% | 7.4% | 11.3% | 21.5% | 11.5% | 9.0% | 6.1% | 6.8% | 3.0% |
| Europe Elects | 31 Dec 2022 | EU27 | 7.1% | 18.7% | 7.6% | 11.5% | 21.1% | 11.6% | 8.9% | 5.4% | 7.9% | 2.4% |
| Europe Elects | 7 Dec 2022 | EU27 | 7.2% | 18.8% | 8.1% | 11.7% | 21.2% | 11.2% | 8.9% | 5.5% | 7.2% | 2.4% |
| Europe Elects | 1 Nov 2022 | EU27 | 8.0% | 18.3% | 8.1% | 12.0% | 21.6% | 11.3% | 8.7% | 5.7% | 6.1% | 3.3% |
| Europe Elects | 8 Jan 2022 | EU27 | 6.7% | 20.6% | 7.2% | 11.9% | 20.7% | 10.3% | 8.8% | 5.0% | 8.8% | 0.1% |
| Europe Elects | 7 Dec 2021 | EU27 | 7.0% | 20.4% | 7.4% | 13.6% | 17.9% | 10.3% | 10.4% | 4.8% | 6.9% | 1.2% |
| Europe Elects | 4 Nov 2021 | EU27 | 6.9% | 20.7% | 7.2% | 13.0% | 19.5% | 10.7% | 10.2% | 5.3% | 6.5% | 1.2% |
| Europe Elects | 8 Oct 2021 | EU27 | 7.3% | 20.3% | 7.2% | 12.0% | 20.3% | 10.5% | 10.3% | 5.3% | 6.8% | Tie |
| Europe Elects | 9 Jul 2021 | EU27 | 7.2% | 17.9% | 8.0% | 11.8% | 21.2% | 10.3% | 10.6% | 5.0% | 8.0% | 3.3% |
| Europe Elects | 5 Jun 2021 | EU27 | 7.8% | 18.0% | 9.1% | 11.4% | 20.6% | 10.5% | 10.4% | 5.0% | 7.1% | 2.6% |
| Europe Elects | 2 May 2021 | EU27 | 7.9% | 18.3% | 8.5% | 11.3% | 20.3% | 10.5% | 10.6% | 5.1% | 7.4% | 2.0% |
| Europe Elects | 2 Apr 2021 | EU27 | 8.0% | 18.7% | 8.2% | 11.2% | 21.6% | 10.2% | 10.8% | 4.9% | 6.3% | 2.9% |
| | 3 Mar 2021 | Hungary's Fidesz party leaves the EPP Group. | | | | | | | | | | |
| Europe Elects | 2 Mar 2021 | EU27 | 7.9% | 18.9% | 7.5% | 11.1% | 23.1% | 10.3% | 10.8% | 3.8% | 6.6% | 4.2% |
| Europe Elects | 2 Feb 2021 | EU27 | 8.2% | 18.6% | 7.5% | 10.9% | 24.4% | 10.1% | 10.5% | 3.8% | 6.0% | 5.8% |
| Europe Elects | 31 Dec 2020 | EU27 | 8.4% | 18.9% | 7.5% | 10.9% | 24.1% | 10.2% | 10.5% | 3.6% | 5.9% | 5.2% |
| Europe Elects | 2 Dec 2020 | EU27 | 8.2% | 18.5% | 7.7% | 10.9% | 24.8% | 9.5% | 10.5% | 3.8% | 6.0% | 6.3% |
| Europe Elects | 31 Oct 2020 | EU27 | 7.6% | 18.4% | 7.7% | 10.8% | 25.0% | 9.9% | 10.6% | 4.0% | 6.1% | 6.6% |
| Europe Elects | 4 Oct 2020 | EU27 | 7.9% | 17.9% | 7.8% | 11.4% | 24.4% | 9.7% | 11.0% | 4.1% | 5.7% | 6.5% |
| Europe Elects | 31 Aug 2020 | EU27 | 8.1% | 18.3% | 7.4% | 11.5% | 25.0% | 9.6% | 10.9% | 4.1% | 5.2% | 6.7% |
| Europe Elects | 14 Aug 2020 | EU27 | 8.0% | 18.0% | 7.2% | 11.5% | 25.3% | 9.4% | 10.8% | 3.8% | 6.0% | 7.3% |
| Europe Elects | 24 Jul 2020 | EU27 | 8.3% | 17.9% | 7.4% | 11.6% | 25.7% | 9.5% | 10.9% | 4.1% | 4.6% | 7.8% |
| Europe Elects | 28 May 2020 | EU27 | 8.2% | 18.0% | 7.2% | 11.3% | 25.2% | 9.6% | 11.1% | 4.0% | 5.4% | 7.2% |
| Europe Elects | 30 Apr 2020 | EU27 | 8.2% | 18.5% | 7.2% | 10.9% | 25.3% | 9.8% | 11.4% | 3.9% | 4.7% | 6.8% |
| Europe Elects | 31 Mar 2020 | EU27 | 8.5% | 18.2% | 8.0% | 10.7% | 24.1% | 10.0% | 11.8% | 3.8% | 4.9% | 5.9% |
| Europe Elects | 29 Feb 2020 | EU27 | 9.1% | 18.0% | 8.4% | 10.9% | 22.7% | 9.7% | 12.5% | 3.8% | 4.9% | 4.7% |
| Europe Elects | 31 Jan 2020 | EU27 | 8.0% | 18.6% | 8.4% | 12.4% | 20.5% | 12.1% | 12.1% | 4.0% | 3.9% | 1.9% |
| | 31 Jan 2020 | The United Kingdom leaves the European Union. | | | | | | | | | | |
| Europe Elects | 31 Dec 2019 | EU28 | 8.1% | 18.8% | 8.2% | 11.8% | 20.9% | 12.4% | 11.9% | 4.2% | 3.7% | 2.1% |
| Europe Elects | 30 Nov 2019 | EU28 | 8.0% | 18.4% | 8.4% | 12.3% | 20.3% | 12.0% | 12.0% | 4.0% | 3.8% | 1.9% |
| Europe Elects | 31 Oct 2019 | EU28 | 6.5% | 17.8% | 8.3% | 13.1% | 20.3% | 10.0% | 11.3% | 4.8% | 7.9% | 2.5% |
| Europe Elects | 30 Sep 2019 | EU28 | 6.6% | 19.5% | 8.3% | 12.3% | 19.6% | 9.7% | 11.3% | 4.8% | 7.9% | 0.1% |
| Europe Elects | 31 Aug 2019 | EU28 | 6.9% | 19.0% | 8.7% | 12.9% | 20.0% | 9.6% | 11.4% | 5.6% | 5.9% | 1.0% |
| Europe Elects | 31 Jul 2019 | EU28 | 6.6% | 19.0% | 9.4% | 12.8% | 19.3% | 9.3% | 11.5% | 5.3% | 6.7% | 0.3% |
| Europe Elects | 30 Jun 2019 | EU28 | 6.9% | 18.9% | 10.3% | 13.3% | 19.1% | 9.8% | 11.4% | 5.1% | 5.2% | 0.2% |
| 2019 European Parliament election | 26 May 2019 | EU27 | 7.0% | 18.9% | 11.2% | 12.3% | 22.6% | 8.1% | 11.5% | 4.3% | 4.1% | 3.7% |
| 2019 European Parliament election | 26 May 2019 | EU28 | 6.5% | 18.5% | 11.7% | 13.0% | 21.0% | 8.2% | 10.8% | 4.8% | 5.5% | 2.5% |

== National opinion polling ==
=== Austria ===
| Polling firm | Fieldwork date | Sample size | ÖVP EPP | SPÖ S&D | FPÖ ID | Grüne G/EFA | NEOS Renew | KPÖ Left | DNA ECR | Others | Lead |
|---|---|---|---|---|---|---|---|---|---|---|---|
| Lazarsfeld Society | 3–4 Jun 2024 | 2,000 | 19-22; 4 | 22-25; 5 | 27-30; 6 | 8-10; 2 | 12-15; 3 | 3; 0 | 2; 0 | — | 5 |
| Lazarsfeld Society | 24–28 May 2024 | 2,000 | 22; 4 | 23; 5 | 28; 6 | 9; 2 | 15; 3 | 2; 0 | 1; 0 | — | 5 |
| Market | 24–28 May 2024 | 814 | 22; 4 | 24; 5 | 27; 6 | 9; 2 | 14; 3 | 3; 0 | 1; 0 | — | 3 |
| IFDD | 22–24 May 2024 | 1,080 | 22; 5 | 23; 5 | 28; 6 | 10; 2 | 12; 2 | 3; 0 | 2; 0 | — | 5 |
| Lazarsfeld Society | 17–21 May 2024 | 1,000 | 22; 4 | 24; 5 | 27; 6 | 9; 2 | 15; 3 | 2; 0 | 1; 0 | — | 3 |
| Spectra | 13–20 May 2024 | 1,000 | 22; 5 | 23; 5 | 26; 5 | 11; 2 | 13; 3 | 3; 0 | 2; 0 | — | 3 |
| IFDD | 15–17 May 2024 | 1,000 | 23; 5 | 22; 5 | 27; 6 | 11; 2 | 12; 2 | 4; 0 | 1; 0 | — | 4 |
| Peter Hajek | 13–17 May 2024 | 1,200 | 23; 5 | 23; 5 | 30; 6 | 10; 2 | 10; 2 | 3; 0 | 1; 0 | — | 7 |
| OGM | 7–8 May 2024 | 1,007 | 22; 5 | 22; 5 | 26; 5 | 13; 2 | 14; 3 | 2; 0 | — | 1; 0 | 4 |
| Lazarsfeld Society | 6–8 May 2024 | 2,000 | 21; 4 | 21; 4 | 26; 6 | 14; 3 | 15; 3 | 2; 0 | 1; 0 | — | 5 |
| Triple-M | 3–7 May 2024 | 800 | 19; 4 | 23; 5 | 27; 6 | 14; 3 | 11; 2 | 4; 0 | — | 2; 0 | 4 |
| Market | 22–25 Apr 2024 | 842 | 20; 4 | 24; 5 | 27; 6 | 12; 2 | 13; 3 | 3; 0 | — | 1; 0 | 3 |
| Lazarsfeld Society | 22–24 Apr 2024 | 2,000 | 21; 4 | 23; 5 | 27; 6 | 12; 2 | 13; 3 | 3; 0 | — | 1; 0 | 4 |
| Ipsos | 23 Feb – 5 Mar 2024 | 1,000 | 21.0; 4 | 22.0; 5 | 28.2; 6 | 13.0; 3 | 11.8; 2 | 2.1; 0 | — | 1.9; 0 | 6.2 |
| Lazarsfeld Society | 26–28 Feb 2024 | 1,000 | 20; 4 | 22; 5 | 26; 5 | 14; 3 | 16; 3 | 2; 0 | — | — | 4 |
| Market | 5–7 Feb 2024 | 800 | 24; 5 | 23; 5 | 27; 6 | 11; 2 | 12; 2 | 2; 0 | — | 1; 0 | 3 |
| Lazarsfeld Society | 29–31 Jan 2024 | 1,000 | 24; 5 | 20; 4 | 27; 6 | 13; 2 | 14; 3 | 2; 0 | — | — | 3 |
| OGM | 22–31 Jan 2024 | 2,076 | 22; 5 | 21; 4 | 26; 6 | 14; 3 | 12; 2 | 2; 0 | — | 3; 0 | 4 |
| IFDD | 25–28 Jan 2024 | 1,000 | 21; 4 | 24; 5 | 27; 6 | 14; 3 | 9; 2 | 3; 0 | — | 2; 0 | 3 |
| Lazarsfeld Society | 11–13 Dec 2023 | 1,000 | 22; 5 | 22; 5 | 30; 6 | 13; 2 | 9; 2 | 2; 0 | — | 2; 0 | 8 |
| Peter Hajek | 22–29 Nov 2023 | 1,600 | 23; 5 | 24; 5 | 30; 7 | 12; 2 | 7; 1 | 3; 0 | — | 1; 0 | 6 |
| IFDD | 1–4 Oct 2023 | 837 | 25; 5/6 | 25; 5/6 | 25; 5/6 | 14; 3 | 8; 1 | — | — | 3; 0 | Tie |
| 2019 legislative election | 29 Sep 2019 | – | 37.5; 8 | 21.2; 5 | 16.2; 3 | 13.9; 3 | 8.1; 1 | 0.7; 0 | — | 2.5; 0 | 16.3 |
| 2019 European election | 26 May 2019 | – | 34.6; 7 | 23.9; 5 | 17.2; 3 | 14.1; 3 | 8.4; 1 | 0.8; 0 | — | 1.0; 0 | 9.7 |

Projected turnout:

According to the OGM poll for the "Kurier" newspaper (May 7-8, 2024), a total of 66% of those surveyed said they are "certain" to vote. This would represent an increase of more than 6% compared to the 2019 election, which had 59.8% turnout. It would also be the highest turnout since the first EU parliament election in Austria in 1996, when turnout was 67.7%.

Other pollsters like the Lazarsfeld Society or Spectra are estimating turnout at between 52% to 63%.

=== Dutch-speaking ===
| Date(s) conducted | Polling firm | Publisher | Sample size | N‑VA ECR | VB ID | Open Vld Renew | cd&v EPP | Groen G/EFA | Vooruit S&D | PVDA Left | Others | Lead |
|---|---|---|---|---|---|---|---|---|---|---|---|---|
| 23 Feb – 5 Mar 2024 | Ipsos | Euronews | 1,500 | 18.7% 3 | 23.5% 3 | 12.7% 2 | 11.5% 1 | 9.7% 1 | 13.8% 2 | 9.3% 1 | 0.8% 0 | 4.8% |
| 26 May 2019 | European election | | | 22.4% 3 | 19.1% 3 | 15.9% 2 | 14.5% 2 | 12.4% 1 | 10.2% 1 | 4.9% 0 | 0.5% 0 | 3.3% |

=== French-speaking ===
| Date(s) conducted | Polling firm | Publisher | Sample size | PS S&D | Ecolo G/EFA | MR Renew | PTB Left | LE EPP | DéFI NI | Others | Lead |
|---|---|---|---|---|---|---|---|---|---|---|---|
| 23 Feb – 5 Mar 2024 | Ipsos | Euronews | 1,500 | 26.7% 2 | 12.8% 1 | 22.8% 2 | 19.2% 2 | 11.0% 1 | 2.8% 0 | 4.7% 0 | 3.9% |
| 26 May 2019 | European election | | | 26.7% 2 | 19.9% 2 | 19.3% 2 | 14.6% 1 | 8.9% 1 | 5.9% 0 | 4.7% 0 | 6.8% |

=== Bulgaria ===
| Polling firm | Fieldwork date | Sample | GERB—SDS EPP | BSPzB S&D | DPS Renew | VMRO ECR | PP–DB Renew-EPP (Note: PP–DB is an electoral alliance, including parties with different european affiliations. PP has expressed interest in joining Renew Europe, while MEP Radan Kanev from DSB sits in the EPP Group and DaB! is considering applying for EPP membership.) | Revival NI | ITN ECR (Note: ITN, despite not being an official member yet, has announced its intention to join the ECR Group.) | Blue Bulgaria ECR | Others | NOTA | Lead |
|---|---|---|---|---|---|---|---|---|---|---|---|---|---|
| Alpha Research | 1-4 June 2024 | 1000 | 25; 5 | 7.9; 2 | 14.1; 3 | — | 15.9; 3 | 15.7; 3 | 5.9; 1 | 2.9; 0 | 12.6 (Note: Includes Solidary Bulgaria at 2.3, winning no seats) | — | 9.1 |
| CAM | 1-4 June 2024 | 821 | 26.2; 5 | 8.1; 2 | 14.1; 3 | — | 17.7; 4 | 14.8; 3 | 5.3; 0 | 2.1; 0 | — | — | 8.5 |
| Sova Haris | 29 May-3 June 2024 | 1000 | 26.4; 6 | 8.9; 2 | 14.4; 3 | — | 15.4; 3 | 15.3; 3 | 5.6; 0 | — | 14 | — | 11 |
| Market Links | 22 May-2 June 2024 | 1004 | 28.8; 6 | 8.7; 2 | 12.4; 3 | — | 20.2; 4 | 11.4; 2 | 3.9; 0 | 2.2; 0 | 7.4 (Note: Includes, CENTER at 2% and Solidary Bulgaria at 1.7% , all winning no seats) | 2.1 | 8.6 |
| TREND | 11–18 May 2024 | 1003 | 25.9; 5 | 8.1; 2 | 14.6; 3 | 1.2; 0 | 16.1; 4 | 15.1; 3 | 5.5; 0 | 1.8; 0 | 12.4 (Note: Includes, Solidary Bulgaria at 2.1%, Left at 1.2%, BV at 1.2%, all winning no seats) | 5.3 | 9.8 |
| Sova Harris | 8–13 May 2024 | 1000 | 28.3; 6 | 10.3; 2 | 13.3; 3 | — | 15.8; 3 | 15; 3 | 5.2; 0 | — | 11.5 | — | 12.5 |
| MarketLinks | 29 April–9 May 2024 | — | 29.4; 6 | 9.3; 2 | 13.1; 3 | — | 20.6; 4 | 12.3; 2 | 2.7; 0 | 1.7; 0 | 6.4 (Note: Includes, Solidary Bulgaria at 2.5% winning no seats) | 4.2 | 8.8 |
| Alpha Research | 28 April–5 May 2024 | 1000 | 25.1; 5 | 8.0; 2 | 14.4; 3 | — | 18.5; 4 | 14.8; 3 | 4.8; 0 | 2.4; 0 | 12.0 (Note: Includes, Solidary Bulgaria at 2.3%, Levitsata! at 1.9%, and Bulgarian Rise at 1.2%, all winning no seats) | — | 6.6 |
| Gallup | 22 April–2 May 2024 | 808 | 26.4; 5 | 8.2; 2 | 14.9; 3 | 1.3; 0 | 17.5; 4 | 14.7; 3 | 4.5; 0 | 1.4; 0 | 11.1 (Note: Includes, Solidary Bulgaria at 2.2%, winning no seats) | — | 8.9 |
| TREND | 12–19 April 2024 | 1002 | 27.2; 5 | 9.4; 2 | 15.4; 3 | — | 17.2; 4 | 15.3; 3 | 5.1; 0 | — | 10.1 (Note: Includes BV and Levitsata!, both at 1.8% and winning no seats) | — | 10.1 |
| Gallup | 28 March-5 April 2024 | 805 | 28.7; 5 | 10.1; 2 | 15.3; 3 | — | 18.2; 4 | 15.1; 3 | 5.5; 0 | — | 9.8 | — | 6.2 |
| IPSOS | N/A | N/A | 27.1; 5 | 8.8; 2 | 13.0; 2 | — | 20.9; 4 | 15.1; 3 | 6.1; 1 | — | 8.9 (Note: Includes BV at 2.9% and Levitsata! at 2.2%, both winning no seats) | — | 6.2 |
| Alpha Research | 1-7 March 2024 | 1000 | 27.0; 5 | 10.6; 2 | 10.0; 2 | — | 23.8; 5 | 15.8; 3 | 5.9; 0 | — | 6.9 | — | 3.2 |
| Market Links | 24 February-3 March 2024 | 1058 | 26.4; 5 | 9.7; 2 | 14.0; 3 | — | 22.7; 4 | 13.5; 3 | 3.8; 0 | — | 6.1 | 3.9 | 3.7 |
| 2019 election | 26 May 2019 | — | 30.4; 6 | 23.5; 5 | 16.1; 3 | 7.1; 2 | 5.9 (Note: Democratic Bulgaria only); 1 | 1.0; 0 | — | — | 2.6 | 4.1 | 6.9 |

=== Croatia ===
| Publication date | Polling firm | Sample size | HDZ EPP | SDP S&D | Most ECR | PiP NI | IDS RE | DP ID | M! G/EFA | Others | Undecided | Lead |
|---|---|---|---|---|---|---|---|---|---|---|---|---|
| 6 Jun 2024 | Ipsos | 1001 | 31.9; 5 | 24.6; 4 | 6.1; 1 | - | 3.7; 0 | 5.8; 1 | 6.5; 1 | (Note: HSU at 3.8%; all others under 3.5% each) | 7.7 | 7.3 |
| 5 Jun 2024 | Promocija plus | 1300 | 28.4; 5 | 20.5; 4 | 5.7; 1 | 3.9; 0 | 3.2; 0 | 6.9; 1 | 7.4; 1 | 11.7 (Note: Including Gen Z list at 2.1%, RF at 1.3%, HSU at 1.1%, and Ladislav Ilčić at 1.0%); 0 | 12.3 | 7.9 |
| 2 Jun 2024 | 2x1 komunikacije | 1041 | 31.2; 5 | 22.0; 3 | 7.1; 1 | 3.7; 0 | 3.8; 0 | 8.7; 1 | 11.1; 2 | - | 11.0 | 9.2 |
| 25 May 2024 | Ipsos | 990 | 28.5; 5 | 17.8; 3 | 5.4; 1 | 1.8; 0 | 3.8; 0 | 7.4; 1 | 9.9; 2 | 12.2 (Note: Including HSU at 1.9%, The Gen Z list at 1.9% and Republika at 1.1%); 0 | 14.9 | 10.7 |
| 4 May 2024 | Promocija plus | 1000 | 30.6; 5 | 24.2; 4 | 5.4; 1 | 2.5; 0 | 2.3; 0 | 6.7; 1 | 7.5; 1 | - | - | 6.4 |
| 17 Apr 2024 | 2024 parliamentary election | – | 34.4 | 25.4 | 8.0 | (Note: with DP) | 2.3 | 9.6 | 9.1 | 11.2 | - | 9.0 |
| 26 May 2019 | 2019 European election | – | 27.1; 4 | 22.1; 4 | 17.6; 1 | 13.6; 2 | 11.9; 1 | – | 1.8; 0 | 5.8 | - | 5.0 |

=== Cyprus ===
| Date | Polling firm | DISY EPP | AKEL Left | ELAM ECR | DIKO S&D | EDEK S&D | DIPA Renew | KOSP G/EFA | APC Left | EP NI | VOLT G/EFA | Fidias NI | Others | Lead |
|---|---|---|---|---|---|---|---|---|---|---|---|---|---|---|
| 9 June 2024 | Election Results | 24.8 | 21.5 | 11.2 | 9.7 | 5.1 | 2.2 | 1.3 | 0.3 | 1.3 | 2.9 | 19.4 | 0.3 | 3.3 |
| 27-30 May 2024 | IMR | 26.6 | 28.3 | 13.7 | 10.6 | 3.4 | 3.0 | 3.2 | - | 2.0 | 2.8 | 7.5 | 0.6 | 1.7 |
| 22-28 May 2024 | CMRC | 28.7 | 27.4 | 14.0 | 12.1 | 3.8 | 1.9 | 3.8 | 1.9 | - | 3.8 | 3.8 | 1.3 | 1.3 |
| 20-25 May 2024 | RAI Consultants | 27.3 | 25.2 | 12.5 | 9.3 | 4.4 | 2.7 | 2.1 | 0.9 | 2.1 | 4.5 | 8.7 | 0.3 | 2.1 |
| 13-25 May 2024 | CYMAR Market Research Ltd | 26.0 | 24.0 | 13.0 | 12.0 | 5.0 | 3.0 | 3.0 | - | - | 4.0 | 6.0 | 4.0 | 2.0 |
| 20-24 May 2024 | Symmetron | 25.6 | 24.2 | 12.0 | 10.2 | 3.7 | 4.3 | 2.6 | - | - | 3.9 | 2.5 | 1.6 | 1.5 |
| 17-24 May 2024 | SIGMA | 29.0 | 27.7 | 13.5 | 12.9 | 3.9 | 2.6 | 3.9 | - | - | 2.6 | 2.6 | 1.3 | 1.3 |
| 16-22 May 2024 | Pulse Market Research | 25.8 | 23.5 | 13.6 | 12.1 | 4.5 | 3.0 | 3.0 | - | - | 5.3 | 6.1 | 3.0 | 2.3 |
| 9-14 May 2024 | Analytica Market Research | 24.3 | 24.9 | 14.5 | 11.9 | 6.0 | 3.5 | 3.7 | - | 3.3 | 3.9 | - | 4.0 | 0.6 |
| 10-22 Apr 2024 | CMRC | 29.0 | 27.5 | 15.2 | 12.3 | 3.6 | 1.4 | 3.6 | 2.9 | - | 3.6 | - | 0.7 | 1.5 |
| 08-19 Apr 2024 | CYMAR Market Research Ltd | 28.1 | 25.0 | 15.6 | 12.5 | 6.3 | 1.6 | 1.6 | - | - | 3.1 | - | 6.3 | 3.1 |
| 14–23 Mar 2024 | SIGMA | 28.1 | 28.1 | 15.1 | 13.7 | 4.1 | 2.7 | 2.7 | - | - | 2.7 | - | 2.7 | 0 |
| 20–26 Feb 2024 | Pulse Market Research | 31.3 | 25.8 | 14.7 | 12.9 | 5.5 | 0.5 | 3.7 | - | - | - | - | 5.5 | 5.5 |
| 12–16 Feb 2024 | SIGMA | 29.0 | 27.5 | 14.5 | 11.6 | 4.3 | 4.3 | 2.9 | 1.4 | - | 1.4 | - | 2.9 | 1.5 |
| 11 Feb 2024 | Symmetron | 25.3 | 23.9 | 11.3 | 9.0 | 3.1 | 3.1 | 2.8 | - | - | 2.5 | - | 1.5 | 1.7 |
| 29 Jan – 02 Feb 2024 | Interview | 31.7 | 31.8 | 15 | 9.0 | 2.4 | 2.2 | 6.8 | - | - | - | - | 1.1 | 0.1 |
| 22–26 Jan 2024 | L.S.Prime | 26.4 | 26.4 | 13.8 | 11.1 | 4.2 | 4.2 | 2.8 | - | - | - | - | 11.1 | 0 |
| 03–11 Jan 2024 | IMR | 25.7 | 27.8 | 17.4 | 9.7 | 3.2 | 3.3 | 4.9 | - | - | 1.8 | - | 3.5 | 2.1 |
| 30 May | Election 2021 | 27.8% | 22.3% | 6.8% | 11.3% | 6.7% | 6.1% | 4.4% | 1.0% | 3.3% | - | | 10.3% | 5.5 |
| 26 May | Election 2019 | 29.0% | 27.5% | 8.2% | 13.8% | 10.6% | 3.8% | - | 0.8% | - | - | | 3.0% | 1.5 |

=== Czech Republic ===
| Polling firm | Fieldwork date | Sample size | SPOLU ECR–EPP | ANO Renew | Piráti G/EFA | STAN EPP | SPD– Trikolóra ID | Stačilo! Left | SOCDEM S&D | Svobodní NI | PaM NI | Zelení EGP | PRO NI | Others | Lead |
|---|---|---|---|---|---|---|---|---|---|---|---|---|---|---|---|
| 7–8 June 2024 | Election result | | 22.3; 6 | 26.1; 7 | 6.2; 1 | 8.7; 2 | 5.7; 1 | 9.6; 2 | 1.9; 0 | 1.8; 0 | 10.3; 2 | 1.6; 0 | 2.2; 0 | 3.9; 0 | 3.8 |
| STEM | 22–26 May 2024 | 1,623 | 21.5; 6 | 23.1; 6 | 9.4; 2 | 10.0; 3 | 9.5; 2 | 8.1; 2 | 2.9; 0 | 2.7; 0 | 4.7; 0 | 1.9; 0 | 1.8; 0 | 4.1; 0 | 1.6 |
| STEM/MARK | 20–27 May 2024 | 1,398 | 22.3; 5 | 26.1; 6 | 12.1; 3 | 8.1; 2 | 7.9; 2 | 7.7; 2 | 3.6; 0 | 2.3; 0 | 7.2; 1 | 1.4; 0 | 1.0; 0 | 0.3; 0 | 3.8 |
| Phoenix Research | 1–13 May 2024 | 1,018 | 17.5; 5 | 27.4; 7 | 9.9; 2 | 11.5; 3 | 6.2; 1 | 7.0; 2 | 5.0; 1 | 1.3; 0 | 2.2; 0 | — | 4.2; 0 | 7.8; 1 | 9.9 |
| SANEP | 2–7 May 2024 | 1,800 | 19.8; 5 | 26.7; 7 | 10.6; 3 | 9.9; 2 | 10.1; 3 | 5.9; 1 | 3.7; 0 | 2.9; 0 | 4.8; 0 | 0.5; 0 | 3.2; 0 | 1.9; 0 | 6.9 |
| STEM/Mark | 28 Mar–8 April 2024 | 1,009 | 20.0; 5 | 27.5; 7 | 10.1; 2 | 10.4; 3 | 10.4; 2 | 6.7; 1 | 3.4; 0 | 2.5; 0 | 6.0; 1 | 0.9; 0 | — | 1.9; 0 | 7.5 |
| Data Collect | 25 Mar 2024 | | 20.9 | 27.3 | 10.8 | 9.3 | 10.9 | 7.1 | 2.9 | 1.5 | 2.5 | 2.5 | 1.9 | 2.4 | 6.4 |
| IPSOS | 23 Feb–5 Mar 2024 | 1,517 | 21.6 | 26.3 | 11.3 | 13.4 | 7.9 | 6.1 | 2.7 | 2.8 | 4.9 | — | — | — | 4.7 |
| IPSOS | Dec 2023 | TBA | 25.2 | 26.3 | 10.0 | 12.0 | 7.7 | 6.0 | — | — | — | — | — | 12.8 | 1.1 |
| STEM/MARK | 23–28 Nov 2023 | 1,010 | 15.0 | 33.8 | 11.4 | 7.3 | 14.7 | 5.4 | 3.6 | 2.9 | — | — | — | 6.0 | 18.8 |
| 2021 parliamentary election | 8–9 Oct 2021 | – | 27.8 | 27.1 | 15.6 | | 9.6 | 3.6 | 4.7 | 2.8 (Note: with Trikolora) | 4.7 | 1.0 | — | 0.9 | 0.7 |
| 2019 European election | 24–25 May 2019 | – | 21.8 (Note: ODS 14.6%, KDU-ČSL 7.2%) | 21.2 | 14.0 | 11.7 (Note: with TOP 09) | 9.1 | 6.9 | 4.0 | 0.7 | — | — | — | 10.6 | 0.6 |

=== Denmark ===
| Polling execution | | | Parties | | | | | | | | | | | | Alliances | | |
| Polling firm | Fieldwork date | Sample size | V Renew | A S&D | F G/EFA | O ID | B Renew | C EPP | Ø Left | Å G/EFA | I EPP | M Renew | Æ ECR | Others | AFÅ | BMV | CI |
|---|---|---|---|---|---|---|---|---|---|---|---|---|---|---|---|---|---|
| 2024 EP election | | | 14.7; 2 | 15.6; 3 | 17.4; 3 | 6.4; 1 | 7.1; 1 | 8.8; 1 | 7.0; 1 | 2.7; 0 | 7.0; 1 | 5.9; 1 | 7.4; 1 | — | 35.7; 6 | 27.7; 4 | 15.8; 2 |
| Epinion (exit poll) | 9 June | ? | 13.9; 2 | 15.4; 3 | 18.4; 3 | 6.5; 1 | 6.9; 1 | 7.4; 1 | 6.6; 1 | 3.3; 0 | 7.8; 1 | 6.2; 1 | 7.6; 1 | — | 37.1; 6 | 27.0; 4 | 15.2; 2 |
| Verian | 29 May–5 Jun 2024 | 2,301 | 11.5; 2 | 18.9; 3 | 16.6; 3 | 7.0; 1 | 5.4; 0 | 6.8; 1 | 6.4; 1 | 2.0; 0 | 10.5; 2 | 5.9; 1 | 8.8; 1 | — | 37.5; 6 | 22.8; 3 | 17.3; 3 |
| Verian | 29 May–5 Jun 2024 | 2,301 | 11.5; 2 | 18.9; 3 | 16.6; 3 | 7.0; 1 | 5.4; 0 | 6.8; 1 | 6.4; 1 | 2.0; 0 | 10.5; 2 | 5.9; 1 | 8.8; 1 | — | 37.5; 6 | 22.8; 3 | 17.3; 3 |
| Epinion | 28 May–3 Jun 2024 | 2,085 | 10.8; 2 | 17.7; 3 | 16.6; 3 | 6.4; 1 | 4.9; 0 | 8.3; 1 | 7.8; 1 | 4.1; 0 | 8.5; 2 | 6.0; 1 | 8.9; 1 | — | 38.4; 6 | 21.7; 3 | 16.8; 3 |
| Epinion | 8–14 May 2024 | 2,025 | 12.5; 2 | 21.4; 4 | 13.1; 2 | 7.4; 1 | 5.4; 1 | 7.1; 1 | 6.8; 1 | 1.7; 0 | 9.9; 2 | 4.0; 0 | 10.4; 1 | — | 36.2; 6 | 21.9; 3 | 17.0; 3 |
| Verian | 8–14 May 2024 | 1,565 | 13.6; 2 | 18.6; 3 | 14.0; 3 | 9.6; 1 | 4.7; 1 | 6.8; 1 | 6.2; 1 | 1.2; 0 | 12.2; 2 | 3.9; 0 | 9.1; 1 | — | 33.8; 6 | 22.2; 3 | 19.0; 3 |
| Epinion | 23–29 Apr 2024 | 1,938 | 11.2; 2 | 20.1; 4 | 14.6; 2 | 6.5; 1 | 7.0; 1 | 6.8; 1 | 6.9; 1 | 2.3; 0 | 12.0; 2 | 4.5; 0 | 8.1; 1 | — | 37.0; 6 | 22.7; 3 | 18.8; 3 |
| Epinion | 6–13 Mar 2024 | 1,074 | 12; 2 | 24; 4 | 14; 2 | 7; 1 | 5; 1 | 5; 1 | 7; 1 | 3; 0 | 9; 1 | 7; 1 | 7; 1 | — | 41; 6 | 24; 4 | 14; 2 |
| Ipsos | 23 Feb–5 Mar 2024 | 1,000 | 10.5; 2 | 21.0; 4 | 12.0; 2 | 5.0; 0 | 6.0; 1 | 6.0; 1 | 8.0; 1 | 2.0; 0 | 13.0; 2 | 7.0; 1 | 8.5; 1 | — | 35.0; 6 | 23.5; 4 | 19.0; 3 |
| Epinion | 24–31 Jan 2024 | 1,051 | 11; 2 | 22; 4 | 12; 2 | 7; 1 | 6; 1 | 6; 1 | 7; 1 | 1; 0 | 10; 1 | 7; 1 | 9; 1 | — | 35; 6 | 24; 4 | 16; 2 |
| 2022 general election | | | 13.3 (3) | 27.5 (6) | 8.3 (1) | 2.6 (0) | 3.8 (0) | 5.5 (1) | 5.1 (0) | 3.3 (0) | 7.9 (1) | 9.3 (2) | 8.1 (1) | 5.2 (0) | 39.1 (7) | 26.4 (4) | 13.4 (2) |
| 2021 municipal elections | | | 21.2 (4) | 28.4 (5) | 7.6 (1) | 4.1 (0) | 5.6 (1) | 15.2 (3) | 7.3 (1) | 0.7 (0) | 1.4 (0) | — | | 8.5 (0) | 36.7 (6) | 26.8 (5) | 16.6 (3) |
| 2019 general election | | | 23.4 (5) | 25.9 (6) | 7.7 (1) | 8.7 (1) | 8.6 (0) | 6.6 (1) | 6.9 (1) | 3.0 (0) | 2.3 (0) | — | | 6.9 (0) | 36.6 (7) | 32.0 (5) | 9.0 (1) |
| 2019 EP election | | | 23.5 (4) | 21.5; 3 | 13.2; 2 | 10.8; 1 | 10.1; 2 | 6.2; 1 | 5.5; 1 | 3.4; 0 | 2.2; 0 | — | | 3.7; 0 | — | | |

=== Estonia ===
| Polling execution | | | Parties | | | | | | | | | | Lead | |
| Polling firm | Fieldwork date | Sample size | Reform Renew | SDE S&D | Centre Renew | EKRE ID | Isamaa EPP | E200 | EER G/EFA | Parem | Koos | Others | Party | EP group |
|---|---|---|---|---|---|---|---|---|---|---|---|---|---|---|
| Norstat | 8–20 May 2024 | 1,471 | 19.1; 1 | 19.3; 2 | 11.5; 1 | 14.2; 1 | 21.3; 2 | 3.8; 0 | 0.9; 0 | 4.3; 0 | 2.9; 0 | 2.7; 0 | 2.0 | 4.6 |
| Kantar Emor | 6–15 May 2024 | 1,471 | 17.2; 2 | 23.6; 2 | 11.0; 1 | 13.6; 1 | 14.0; 1 | 4.1; 0 | 0.9; 0 | 7.2; 0 | 3.1; 0 | 5.4; 0 | 6.4 | 9.3 |
| Norstat | 29 Apr–6 May 2024 | 1,484 | 19.3; 2 | 21.4; 2 | 9.4; 1 | 17.9; 1 | 17.1; 1 | 3.9; 0 | 0.9; 0 | 4.5; 0 | 3.0; 0 | 2.7; 0 | 2.1 | 7.3 |
| Kantar Emor | 8-17 Apr 2024 | 1,484 | 18.8; 2 | 20; 2 | 13.8; 1 | 13.8; 1 | 16.8; 1 | 4.7; 0 | 1.5; 0 | 6; 0 | — | 4.5; 0 | 1.2 | 12.6 |
| Norstat | 11-15 Apr 2024 | 3,500 | 20.1; 2 | 22.0; 2 | 11.0; 1 | 17.2; 1 | 17.6; 1 | 5.0; 0 | 1.2; 0 | 4.7; 0 | — | 1.2; 0 | 1.9 | 9.1 |
| Kantar Emor | 14-20 Mar 2024 | 1,135 | 18.9; 2 | 21.4; 2 | 13.9; 1 | 15.4; 1 | 16.7; 1 | 5.6; 0 | — (Note: Included under Others.) | 5.9; 0 | — | 2.1; 0 | 2.5 | 11.4 |
| 2023 parliamentary election | | | 31.2; 3 | 9.3; 1 | 15.3; 1 | 16.1; 1 | 8.2; 0 | 13.3; 1 | 1.0; 0 | 2.3; 0 | — | 3.3; 0 | 15.1 | 30.4 |
| 2019 EP election | | | 26.2; 2 | 23.3; 2 | 14.4; 1 | 12.7; 1 | 10.3; 1 | 3.2; 0 | 1.8; 0 | — | — | 8.0; 0 | 2.9 | 17.3 |

=== Finland ===
| Polling firm | Fieldwork date | Sample size | KOK EPP | VIHR G/EFA | SDP S&D | PS ECR | KESK Renew | VAS Left | SFP Renew | KD EPP | LIIK NI | Others | Lead |
|---|---|---|---|---|---|---|---|---|---|---|---|---|---|
| Taloustutkimus | 29 May–4 June 2024 | 2,111 | 20.6; 4 | 9.3; 1 | 19.4; 3 | 16.4; 3 | 11.9; 2 | 10.8; 2 | 4.2; 0 | 4; 0 | 1.1; 0 | 2.2; 0 | 1.2 |
| Taloustutkimus | 23–29 Apr 2024 | 2,118 | 21.7; 4 | 10.5; 2 | 19.7; 3 | 14.1; 2 | 13.6; 2 | 10.5; 2 | 4.0; 0 | 2.9; 0 | 1.0; 0 | 2.1; 0 | 2.0 |
| Verian | 18–25 Mar 2024 | 1,372 | 22; 4 | 11; 2 | 17; 3 | 14; 2 | 12; 2 | 9; 1 | 5; 0 | 6; 1 | | 4; 0 | 5 |
| Ipsos | 23 Feb–5 Mar 2024 | 1,000 | 22.5; 4 | 9.0; 1 | 20.0; 4 | 19.0; 3 | 10.5; 2 | 8.5; 1 | 3.5; 0 | 3.5; 0 | 3.5; 0 | | 2.5 |
| 2023 parliamentary election | | | 20.8 | 7.0 | 19.9 | 20.1 | 11.3 | 7.1 | 4.3 | 4.2 | 2.4 | 2.9 | 0.7 |
| 2019 EP election | | | 20.8; 3 | 16.0; 3 | 14.6; 2 | 13.8; 2 | 13.5; 2 | 6.9; 1 | 6.3; 1 | 4.9; 0 | 3.1; 0 | | 4.8 |

=== France ===
| Polling firm | Fieldwork date | Sample size | LO NI | NPA Left | PCF Left | LFI Left | ND S&D | PS–PP S&D | EELV G/EFA | GE NI | PRG G/EFA (Note: Alliance with R&PS and Volt France) | PS diss. | UDMF NI | EAC G/EFA | ÉPT Renew | PP G/EFA | PA Left | Ens. Renew | AR | | NE EPP | LR EPP | DLF ECR | UPR NI | LP–VIA ECR | RN ID | REC ECR | Others | Lead |
| Polling firm | Fieldwork date | Sample size | LO NI | NPA Left | PCF Left | LFI Left | ND S&D | PS–PP S&D | EELV G/EFA | GE NI | PRG G/EFA | PS diss. | UDMF NI | EAC G/EFA | ÉPT Renew | PP G/EFA | PA Left | Ens. Renew | FNC NI | R! NI | NE EPP | LR EPP | DLF ECR | UPR NI | LP–VIA ECR | RN ID | REC ECR | Others | Lead |
|---|---|---|---|---|---|---|---|---|---|---|---|---|---|---|---|---|---|---|---|---|---|---|---|---|---|---|---|---|---|
| Ipsos | 06–7 Jun 2024 | 8,923 | 0.5 | 0.5 | 2.5 | 9.5 | 0.5 | 14.5 | 5 | – | 0.5 | – | <0.5 | 0.5 | 0.5 | <0.5 | 2.5 | 15 | 1.5 | | – | 7 | – | 0.5 | 1 | 32 | 5.5 | 1 (Note: PRC <0.5%, France Libre–Union de la Résistance <0.5%, Défendre les enfants <0.5%, The Nationalists <0.5%, République souveraine–L'appel au peuple <0.5%, PT <0.5%, Association nationale des communistes <0.5%, Parti des citoyens européens <0.5%, Équinoxe <0.5%, EDE <0.5%, Rester libre <0.5%, La Ruche citoyenne <0.5%, Écologie politique et de pacifisme et objection de croissanc <0.5%, Décidons nous-mêmes <0.5%, Démocratie représentative <0.5%, Fédération citoyenne–Nous Citoyens <0.5%, Changement citoyen <0.5%, Liberté Démocratique Française <0.5%) | 17 |
| Harris Interactive | 05–7 Jun 2024 | 2,200 | 0.5 | 0.5 | 3 | 9.5 | <0.5 | 13 | 5 | – | <0.5 | – | 0.5 | 0.5 | 0.5 | <0.5 | 2 | 14 | 1 | | – | 7.5 | – | 1 | 1 | 32 | 5 | (Note: République souveraine–L'appel au peuple <0.5%, France Libre–Union de la Résistance <0.5%, Défendre les enfants <0.5%, PRC <0.5%, The Nationalists <0.5%, PT <0.5%, Association nationale des communistes <0.5%, Parti des citoyens européens <0.5%, Équinoxe <0.5%, EDE <0.5%, Rester libre <0.5%, La Ruche citoyenne <0.5%, Écologie politique et de pacifisme et objection de croissanc <0.5%, Décidons nous-mêmes <0.5%, Démocratie représentative <0.5%, Fédération citoyenne–Nous Citoyens <0.5%, Changement citoyen <0.5%, Liberté Démocratique Française <0.5%) | 18 |
| Elabe | 05–7 Jun 2024 | 2,001 | 1 | 0.5 | 2.5 | 9.5 | <0.5 | 14.5 | 5.5 | – | <0.5 | – | <0.5 | 0.5 | 0.5 | <0.5 | 2.5 | 16 | 1.5 | | – | 6 | – | 1 | 1 | 32 | 5.5 | 1.5 (Note: France Libre–Union de la Résistance <0.5%, Décidons nous-mêmes <0.5%, Parti des citoyens européens <0.5%, Écologie politique et de pacifisme et objection de croissanc <0.5%, PT <0.5%, Changement citoyen <0.5%, PRC <0.5%, Équinoxe <0.5%, Fédération citoyenne–Nous Citoyens <0.5%, République souveraine–L'appel au peuple <0.5%, Rester libre <0.5%, The Nationalists <0.5%, Association nationale des communiste <0.5%, La Ruche citoyenne <0.5%, Défendre les enfants <0.5%, Démocratie représentative <0.5%, EDE <0.5%, Liberté Démocratique Française <0.5%) | 16 |
| Ifop | 04–7 Jun 2024 | 2,710 | 0.5 | 0.5 | 2.5 | 9 | <0.5 | 13.5 | 5.5 | – | <0.5 | – | <0.5 | 0.5 | <0.5 | – | 2.5 | 14.5 | 1.5 | | – | 7 | – | 1 | 1 | 33 | 6 | 1.5 | 18.5 |
| Odoxa | 05–6 Jun 2024 | 1.008 | 1.5 | 0.5 | 2 | 7 | 0.5 | 14 | 5 | – | <0.5 | – | <0.5 | 0.5 | <0.5 | <0.5 | 3.5 | 15 | 2 | | – | 7 | – | 1 | 1 | 32 | 6 | (Note: République souveraine–L'appel au peuple <0.5%, France Libre–Union de la Résistance <0.5%, Défendre les enfants <0.5%, PRC <0.5%, The Nationalists <0.5%, PT <0.5%, Association nationale des communistes <0.5%, Parti des citoyens européens <0.5%, Équinoxe <0.5%, EDE <0.5%, Rester libre <0.5%, La Ruche citoyenne <0.5%, Écologie politique et de pacifisme et objection de croissanc <0.5%, Décidons nous-mêmes <0.5%, Démocratie représentative <0.5%, Fédération citoyenne–Nous Citoyens <0.5%, Changement citoyen <0.5%, Liberté Démocratique Française <0.5%) | 17 |
| Ipsos | 05–6 Jun 2024 | 1,738 | 0.5 | 0.5 | 2.5 | 9 | <0.5 | 13.5 | 6 | – | 0.5 | – | <0.5 | 1.5 | <0.5 | <0.5 | 1.5 | 15.5 | 1 | | – | 7 | – | 1 | 1 | 32 | 5.5 | 1.5 (Note: République souveraine–L'appel au peuple <0.5%, Parti des citoyens européens <0.5%, Liberté Démocratique Française <0.5%, Association nationale des communistes <0.5%, EDE <0.5%, Démocratie représentative <0.5%, Défendre les enfants <0.5%, France Libre–Union de la Résistance <0.5%, Fédération citoyenne–Nous Citoyens <0.5%, Changement citoyen <0.5%, PRC <0.5%, Écologie politique et de pacifisme et objection de croissanc <0.5%, Décidons nous-mêmes <0.5%, PT <0.5%, Rester libre <0.5%, La Ruche citoyenne <0.5%, The Nationalists <0.5%, Équinoxe <0.5%) | 16.5 |
| OpinionWay | 04–6 Jun 2024 | 2,182 | 1 | 1 | 2 | 8 | <1 | 14 | 5 | – | <1 | – | <1 | <1 | <1 | <1 | 3 | 15 | 1 | | – | 6 | – | 1 | 1 | 33 | 6 | 3 (Note: PT <1%, Association nationale des communiste <1%, PRC <1%, The Nationalists <1%, Équinoxe <1%, France Libre–Union de la Résistance <1%, EDE <1%, Démocratie représentative <1%, Défendre les enfants <1%, République souveraine–L'appel au peuple <1%, Rester libre <1%, Fédération citoyenne–Nous Citoyens <1%, Parti des citoyens européens <1%, Décidons nous-mêmes <1%, Changement citoyen <1%, La Ruche citoyenne <1%, Écologie politique et de pacifisme et objection de croissanc <1%) | 18 |
| Cluster17 | 04–6 Jun 2024 | 1,165 | 1 | 0.5 | 2 | 9 | 0.5 | 13 | 5 | – | 0.5 | – | <0.5 | 0.5 | <0.5 | <0.5 | 2.5 | 15 | 1.5 | | – | 7 | – | 1.5 | 1.5 | 31 | 5.5 | <3 (Note: République souveraine–L'appel au peuple 0.5%, Parti des citoyens européens 0.5%, Liberté Démocratique Française <0.5%, Association nationale des communistes <0.5%, EDE <0.5%, Démocratie représentative <0.5%, Défendre les enfants <0.5%, France Libre–Union de la Résistance <0.5%, Fédération citoyenne–Nous Citoyens <0.5%, Changement citoyen <0.5%, PRC <0.5%, Écologie politique et de pacifisme et objection de croissanc <0.5%, Décidons nous-mêmes <0.5%, PT <0.5%, Rester libre <0.5%, La Ruche citoyenne <0.5%, The Nationalists <0.5%, Équinoxe <0.5%) | 16 |
| OpinionWay | 04–6 Jun 2024 | 1,027 | 1 | 1 | 3 | 7 | – | 13 | 6 | – | <1 | – | <1 | <1 | <1 | <1 | 2 | 15 | 1 | | – | 7 | – | 1 | 1 | 33 | 6 | 4 (Note: PT <1%, Association nationale des communiste <1%, PRC <1%, The Nationalists <1%, Équinoxe <1%, France Libre–Union de la Résistance <1%, EDE <1%, Démocratie représentative <1%, Défendre les enfants <1%, République souveraine–L'appel au peuple <1%, Rester libre <1%, Fédération citoyenne–Nous Citoyens <1%, Parti des citoyens européens <1%, Décidons nous-mêmes <1%, Changement citoyen <1%, La Ruche citoyenne <1%, Écologie politique et de pacifisme et objection de croissanc <1%) | 18 |
| Harris Interactive | 04–6 Jun 2024 | 2,200 | 0.5 | 0.5 | 3.5 | 8.5 | <0.5 | 13 | 5.5 | – | <0.5 | – | 0.5 | 0.5 | 0.5 | <0.5 | 2 | 14.5 | 1 | | – | 7 | – | 1 | 1 | 32 | 5 | (Note: République souveraine–L'appel au peuple <0.5%, France Libre–Union de la Résistance <0.5%, Défendre les enfants <0.5%, PRC <0.5%, The Nationalists <0.5%, PT <0.5%, Association nationale des communistes <0.5%, Parti des citoyens européens <0.5%, Équinoxe <0.5%, EDE <0.5%, Rester libre <0.5%, La Ruche citoyenne <0.5%, Écologie politique et de pacifisme et objection de croissanc <0.5%, Décidons nous-mêmes <0.5%, Démocratie représentative <0.5%, Fédération citoyenne–Nous Citoyens <0.5%, Changement citoyen <0.5%, Liberté Démocratique Française <0.5%) | 17.5 |
| Ifop | 03–6 Jun 2024 | 2,710 | 0.5 | 0.5 | 2 | 8.5 | <0.5 | 13.5 | 5.5 | – | <0.5 | – | <0.5 | 0.5 | <0.5 | – | 2.5 | 15 | 1.5 | | – | 7 | – | 1 | 1 | 33 | 6 | 1.5 | 18 |
| Harris Interactive | 04–5 Jun 2024 | 2,130 | 0.5 | 0.5 | 3 | 9 | <0.5 | 13 | 6 | – | <0.5 | – | 0.5 | 0.5 | 0.5 | <0.5 | 2 | 14 | 1 | | – | 7.5 | – | 1 | 1 | 32 | 5 | (Note: , PT<0.5%, République souveraine–L'appel au peuple 0.5%, France Libre–Union de la Résistance <0.5%, Défendre les enfants <0.5%, PRC <0.5%, The Nationalists <0.5%Association nationale des communistes <0.5%, Parti des citoyens européens <0.5%, Équinoxe <0.5%, EDE <0.5%, Rester libre <0.5%, La Ruche citoyenne <0.5%, Écologie politique et de pacifisme et objection de croissanc <0.5%, Décidons nous-mêmes <0.5%, Démocratie représentative <0.5%, Fédération citoyenne–Nous Citoyens <0.5%, Changement citoyen <0.5%, Liberté Démocratique Française <0.5%) | 17.5 |
| BVA | 03–5 Jun 2024 | 1,500 | 1 | <0.5 | 2.5 | 7.5 | 0.5 | 14 | 5.5 | – | 0.5 | – | <0.5 | 1 | <0.5 | <0.5 | 2.5 | 16 | 1 | | – | 6.5 | – | 1.5 | 0.5 | 33 | 5 | 3 (Note: République souveraine–L'appel au peuple 0.5%, PT 0.5%, France Libre–Union de la Résistance <0.5%, Défendre les enfants <0.5%, PRC <0.5%, The Nationalists <0.5%, Association nationale des communistes <0.5%, Parti des citoyens européens <0.5%, Équinoxe <0.5%, EDE <0.5%, Rester libre <0.5%, La Ruche citoyenne <0.5%, Écologie politique et de pacifisme et objection de croissanc <0.5%, Décidons nous-mêmes <0.5%, Démocratie représentative <0.5%, Fédération citoyenne–Nous Citoyens <0.5%, Changement citoyen <0.5%, Liberté Démocratique Française <0.5%) | 17 |
| Ifop | 01–5 Jun 2024 | 2,724 | 0.5 | 0.5 | 2.5 | 8 | <0.5 | 13.5 | 5 | – | <0.5 | – | <0.5 | 0.5 | <0.5 | – | 2.5 | 15 | 1 | | – | 7.5 | – | 0.5 | 1 | 33 | 6 | 1.5 | 18 |
| YouGov | 31 May – 5 Jun 2024 | 1,035 | 1 | <1 | 3 | 6 | 1 | 12 | 4 | – | 1 | – | 1 | – | – | – | 3 | 15 | 1 | | – | 6 | – | 1 | 1 | 32 | 6 | 2 | 15 |
| Harris Interactive | 03–4 Jun 2024 | 2,130 | 0.5 | 0.5 | 3 | 9 | <0.5 | 13 | 6 | – | <0.5 | – | 0.5 | 0.5 | 0.5 | <0.5 | 2 | 14.5 | 1 | | – | 7.5 | – | 1 | 1 | 32 | 5 | (Note: République souveraine–L'appel au peuple 0.5%, France Libre–Union de la Résistance <0.5%, Défendre les enfants <0.5%, PRC <0.5%, The Nationalists <0.5%, PT <0.5%, Association nationale des communistes <0.5%, Parti des citoyens européens <0.5%, Équinoxe <0.5%, EDE <0.5%, Rester libre <0.5%, La Ruche citoyenne <0.5%, Écologie politique et de pacifisme et objection de croissanc <0.5%, Décidons nous-mêmes <0.5%, Démocratie représentative <0.5%, Fédération citoyenne–Nous Citoyens <0.5%, Changement citoyen <0.5%, Liberté Démocratique Française <0.5%) | 17.5 |
| Ifop | 31 May – 4 Jun 2024 | 2,734 | 0.5 | 0.5 | 2.5 | 7.5 | <0.5 | 14 | 5.5 | – | <0.5 | – | <0.5 | 0.5 | <0.5 | – | 2 | 15 | 1 | | – | 7 | – | 1 | 1 | 33 | 6 | 2 | 18 |
| Harris Interactive | 02–3 Jun 2024 | 2,130 | 0.5 | 0.5 | 3 | 9 | <0.5 | 13 | 6 | – | <0.5 | – | <0.5 | 0.5 | 0.5 | <0.5 | 2 | 14.5 | 1 | | – | 7.5 | – | 1 | 1 | 32 | 5 | (Note: République souveraine–L'appel au peuple 0.5%, France Libre–Union de la Résistance <0.5%, Défendre les enfants <0.5%, PRC <0.5%, The Nationalists <0.5%, PT <0.5%, Association nationale des communistes <0.5%, Parti des citoyens européens <0.5%, Équinoxe <0.5%, EDE <0.5%, Rester libre <0.5%, La Ruche citoyenne <0.5%, Écologie politique et de pacifisme et objection de croissanc <0.5%, Décidons nous-mêmes <0.5%, Démocratie représentative <0.5%, Fédération citoyenne–Nous Citoyens <0.5%, Changement citoyen <0.5%, Liberté Démocratique Française <0.5%) | 17.5 |
| Ifop | 30 May – 3 Jun 2024 | 2,751 | 0.5 | 0.5 | 2.5 | 7.5 | <0.5 | 14 | 6 | – | <0.5 | – | <0.5 | 0.5 | <0.5 | – | 2 | 15.5 | 1 | | – | 7 | – | 1 | 1 | 33.5 | 6 | 1.5 | 18 |
| Elabe | 29–31 May 2024 | 1,688 | 1 | 0.5 | 3 | 8.5 | <0.5 | 13 | 7 | – | <0.5 | – | <0.5 | 0.5 | 0.5 | <0.5 | 2 | 16 | 1 | | – | 6.5 | – | 1 | 1 | 32.5 | 5 | 1.5 (Note: France Libre–Union de la Résistance 0.5%, Décidons nous-mêmes <0.5%, Parti des citoyens européens <0.5%, Écologie politique et de pacifisme et objection de croissanc <0.5%, PT <0.5%, Changement citoyen <0.5%, PRC <0.5%, Équinoxe <0.5%, Fédération citoyenne–Nous Citoyens <0.5%, République souveraine–L'appel au peuple <0.5%, Rester libre <0.5%, The Nationalists <0.5%, Association nationale des communiste <0.5%, La Ruche citoyenne <0.5%, Défendre les enfants <0.5%, Démocratie représentative <0.5%, EDE <0.5%, Liberté Démocratique Française <0.5%) | 16.5 |
| Harris Interactive | 30–31 May 2024 | 2,178 | 0.5 | 0.5 | 3 | 8.5 | <0.5 | 13.5 | 5.5 | – | <0.5 | – | 0.5 | 0.5 | 0.5 | <0.5 | 2 | 14.5 | 1 | | – | 7 | – | 1 | 1 | 32 | 5.5 | (Note: République souveraine–L'appel au peuple 0.5%, France Libre–Union de la Résistance <0.5%, Défendre les enfants <0.5%, PRC <0.5%, The Nationalists <0.5%, PT <0.5%, Association nationale des communistes <0.5%, Parti des citoyens européens <0.5%, Équinoxe <0.5%, EDE <0.5%, Rester libre <0.5%, La Ruche citoyenne <0.5%, Écologie politique et de pacifisme et objection de croissanc <0.5%, Décidons nous-mêmes <0.5%, Démocratie représentative <0.5%, Fédération citoyenne–Nous Citoyens <0.5%, Changement citoyen <0.5%, Liberté Démocratique Française <0.5%) | 17.5 |
| Ifop | 28–31 May 2024 | 2,713 | 0.5 | 0.5 | 3 | 7 | <0.5 | 14 | 6.5 | – | <0.5 | – | <0.5 | 0.5 | <0.5 | – | 2 | 15.5 | 1 | | – | 7 | – | 0.5 | 0.5 | 33.5 | 6.5 | 1.5 | 18 |
| OpinionWay | 28–30 May 2024 | 2,149 | 1 | 2 | 2 | 6 | <1 | 14 | 5 | – | <1 | – | <1 | <1 | <1 | <1 | 2 | 15 | 1 | | – | 7 | – | <1 | 1 | 33 | 6 | 4 (Note: PT <1%, Association nationale des communiste <1%, PRC <1%, The Nationalists <1%, Équinoxe <1%, France Libre–Union de la Résistance <1%, EDE <1%, Démocratie représentative <1%, Défendre les enfants <1%, République souveraine–L'appel au peuple <1%, Rester libre <1%, Fédération citoyenne–Nous Citoyens <1%, Parti des citoyens européens <1%, Décidons nous-mêmes <1%, Changement citoyen <1%, La Ruche citoyenne <1%, Écologie politique et de pacifisme et objection de croissanc <1%) | 17 |
| Cluster17 | 28–30 May 2024 | 1,165 | 1 | 0.5 | 2 | 8 | 0.5 | 13.5 | 5 | – | 0.5 | – | <0.5 | 0.5 | <0.5 | <0.5 | 2.5 | 15.5 | 1.5 | | – | 7 | – | 1.5 | 1.5 | 30 | 6 | <3 (Note: République souveraine–L'appel au peuple 0.5%, Parti des citoyens européens 0.5%, Liberté Démocratique Française <0.5%, Association nationale des communistes <0.5%, EDE <0.5%, Démocratie représentative <0.5%, Défendre les enfants <0.5%, France Libre–Union de la Résistance <0.5%, Fédération citoyenne–Nous Citoyens <0.5%, Changement citoyen <0.5%, PRC <0.5%, Écologie politique et de pacifisme et objection de croissanc <0.5%, Décidons nous-mêmes <0.5%, PT <0.5%, Rester libre <0.5%, La Ruche citoyenne <0.5%, The Nationalists <0.5%, Équinoxe <0.5%) | 14.5 |
| Harris Interactive | 29–30 May 2024 | 2,200 | 0.5 | 0.5 | 3 | 8 | <0.5 | 13.5 | 5.5 | – | <0.5 | – | <0.5 | 0.5 | 0.5 | <0.5 | 1.5 | 14.5 | 1 | | – | 7 | – | 1 | 1 | 33 | 5.5 | (Note: PRC 0.5%, France Libre–Union de la Résistance 0.5%, Défendre les enfants 0.5%, The Nationalists <0.5%, République souveraine–L'appel au peuple <0.5%, PT <0.5%, Association nationale des communistes <0.5%, Parti des citoyens européens <0.5%, Équinoxe <0.5%, EDE <0.5%, Rester libre <0.5%, La Ruche citoyenne <0.5%, Écologie politique et de pacifisme et objection de croissanc <0.5%, Décidons nous-mêmes <0.5%, Démocratie représentative <0.5%, Fédération citoyenne–Nous Citoyens <0.5%, Changement citoyen <0.5%, Liberté Démocratique Française <0.5%) | 18.5 |
| Ipsos | 27–30 May 2024 | 11,430 | 0.5 | 0.5 | 2 | 8 | 0.5 | 14.5 | 6 | – | 0.5 | – | <0.5 | 0.5 | 0.5 | <0.5 | 1.5 | 16 | 1 | | – | 7 | – | 1 | 1 | 33 | 5 | (Note: PRC <0.5%, France Libre–Union de la Résistance <0.5%, Défendre les enfants <0.5%, The Nationalists <0.5%, République souveraine–L'appel au peuple <0.5%, PT <0.5%, Association nationale des communistes <0.5%, Parti des citoyens européens <0.5%, Équinoxe <0.5%, EDE <0.5%, Rester libre <0.5%, La Ruche citoyenne <0.5%, Écologie politique et de pacifisme et objection de croissanc <0.5%, Décidons nous-mêmes <0.5%, Démocratie représentative <0.5%, Fédération citoyenne–Nous Citoyens <0.5%, Changement citoyen <0.5%, Liberté Démocratique Française <0.5%) | 17 |
| Ifop | 26–30 May 2024 | 2,700 | 0.5 | 0.5 | 3 | 7 | <0.5 | 14 | 6.5 | – | <0.5 | – | <0.5 | 0.5 | <0.5 | – | 1.5 | 16 | 1 | | – | 7 | – | 0.5 | 1 | 33.5 | 6.5 | 1 | 17.5 |
| OpinionWay | 28–29 May 2024 | 1,008 | 1 | 3 | 2 | 6 | – | 14 | 5 | – | – | – | – | – | – | – | 2 | 15 | 1 | | – | 7 | – | 1 | 1 | 32 | 7 | 3 | 17 |
| Harris Interactive | 28–29 May 2024 | 2,016 | 0.5 | 0.5 | 3 | 8 | 0.5 | 14 | 5.5 | – | 0.5 | – | 0.5 | 0.5 | 0.5 | <0.5 | 1 | 14.5 | 1 | | – | 7 | – | 1 | 1 | 32.5 | 5 | 4 (Note: République souveraine–L'appel au peuple 0.5%, PT 0.5%, Parti des citoyens européens 0.5%, Défendre les enfants 0.5%, The Nationalists <0.5%, PRC <0.5%, Association nationale des communistes <0.5%, Équinoxe <0.5%, EDE <0.5%, Rester libre <0.5%, La Ruche citoyenne <0.5%, Écologie politique et de pacifisme et objection de croissanc <0.5%, Décidons nous-mêmes <0.5%, Démocratie représentative <0.5%, Fédération citoyenne–Nous Citoyens <0.5%, France Libre–Union de la Résistance <0.5%, Changement citoyen <0.5%, Liberté Démocratique Française <0.5%) | 17.5 |
| Ifop | 25–29 May 2024 | 2,250 | 0.5 | <0.5 | 3 | 7 | <0.5 | 14 | 6.5 | – | 0.5 | – | <0.5 | 0.5 | <0.5 | – | 1.5 | 16 | 1 | | – | 7 | – | 1 | 1 | 33.5 | 6.5 | 1 | 17.5 |
| Harris Interactive | 27–28 May 2024 | 2,016 | 0.5 | 0.5 | 3 | 8.5 | 0.5 | 14 | 5 | – | 0.5 | – | <0.5 | 0.5 | 0.5 | <0.5 | 1 | 15 | 1 | | – | 7.5 | – | 1 | 1 | 32 | 5 | 4 (Note: The Nationalists <0.5%, République souveraine–L'appel au peuple <0.5%, PRC <0.5%, PT <0.5%, Association nationale des communistes <0.5%, Parti des citoyens européens <0.5%, Équinoxe <0.5%, EDE <0.5%, Rester libre <0.5%, La Ruche citoyenne <0.5%, Écologie politique et de pacifisme et objection de croissanc <0.5%, Décidons nous-mêmes <0.5%, Démocratie représentative <0.5%, Fédération citoyenne–Nous Citoyens <0.5%, France Libre–Union de la Résistance <0.5%, Défendre les enfants <0.5%, Changement citoyen <0.5%, Liberté Démocratique Française <0.5%) | 17 |
| Ifop | 24–28 May 2024 | 1,809 | 0.5 | <0.5 | 2.5 | 7.5 | <0.5 | 14 | 6 | – | 0.5 | – | 0.5 | 0.5 | <0.5 | – | 1 | 15.5 | 1 | | – | 7 | – | 1 | 1 | 34 | 6 | 1.5 | 18.5 |
| Harris Interactive | 24–27 May 2024 | 2,016 | 0.5 | 0.5 | 3 | 8.5 | 0.5 | 14 | 5 | – | 0.5 | – | <0.5 | 0.5 | 0.5 | <0.5 | 1 | 14.5 | 1 | | – | 7 | – | 1 | 1 | 32 | 5 | 4 (Note: The Nationalists <0.5%, République souveraine–L'appel au peuple <0.5%, PRC <0.5%, PT <0.5%, Association nationale des communistes <0.5%, Parti des citoyens européens <0.5%, Équinoxe <0.5%, EDE <0.5%, Rester libre <0.5%, La Ruche citoyenne <0.5%, Écologie politique et de pacifisme et objection de croissanc <0.5%, Décidons nous-mêmes <0.5%, Démocratie représentative <0.5%, Fédération citoyenne–Nous Citoyens <0.5%, France Libre–Union de la Résistance <0.5%, Défendre les enfants <0.5%, Changement citoyen <0.5%, Liberté Démocratique Française <0.5%) | 17.5 |
| Ifop | 23–27 May 2024 | 1,362 | 0.5 | 0.5 | 2 | 7.5 | <0.5 | 14.5 | 5.5 | – | 0.5 | – | 0.5 | 0.5 | 0.5 | – | 1 | 16 | 1 | | – | 7.5 | – | 0.5 | 1 | 33.5 | 6 | 1 | 17.5 |
| Elabe | 24–25 May 2024 | 1,688 | 1 | <0.5 | 2 | 8 | <0.5 | 13 | 6 | – | <0.5 | – | <0.5 | 1 | 0.5 | 0.5 | 2 | 15.5 | 1.5 | | – | 7 | – | 1 | 0.5 | 33 | 5.5 | 2 (Note: Décidons nous-mêmes 0.5%, Parti des citoyens européens 0.5%, Écologie politique et de pacifisme et objection de croissanc 0.5%, PT 0.5%, Changement citoyen <0.5%, PRC <0.5%, Équinoxe <0.5%, Fédération citoyenne–Nous Citoyens <0.5%, République souveraine–L'appel au peuple <0.5%, Rester libre <0.5%, The Nationalists <0.5%, Association nationale des communiste <0.5%, France Libre–Union de la Résistance <0.5%, La Ruche citoyenne <0.5%, Défendre les enfants <0.5%, Démocratie représentative <0.5%, EDE <0.5%, Liberté Démocratique Française <0.5%) | 17.5 |
| Odoxa | 23–24 May 2024 | 991 | 2 | 1 | 2.5 | 7 | <0.5 | 13.5 | 6 | – | 0.5 | – | – | 0.5 | – | – | 1.5 | 15 | 1 | | – | 7 | – | 0.5 | 1.5 | 34 | 4 | 0.5 | 16.5 |
| Ifop | 21–24 May 2024 | 1,362 | 0.5 | 0.5 | 2 | 7.5 | <0.5 | 14.5 | 5 | – | <0.5 | – | <0.5 | 0.5 | 0.5 | – | 1.5 | 16 | 1 | | – | 7.5 | – | 0.5 | 1.5 | 33 | 6.5 | 1.5 | 17 |
| OpinionWay | 21–24 May 2024 | 2,024 | 2 | 2 | 2 | 7 | <1 | 13 | 5 | – | <1 | – | <1 | <1 | <1 | <1 | 1 | 15 | <1 | | – | 8 | – | <1 | 1 | 32 | 7 | 5 (Note: , PT <1%, Association nationale des communiste <1%, PRC <1%, The Nationalists <1%, Équinoxe <1%, France Libre–Union de la Résistance <1%, EDE <1%, Démocratie représentative <1%, Défendre les enfants <1%, République souveraine–L'appel au peuple <1%, Rester libre <1%, Fédération citoyenne–Nous Citoyens <1%, Parti des citoyens européens <1%, Décidons nous-mêmes <1%, Changement citoyen <1%, La Ruche citoyenne <1%, Écologie politique et de pacifisme et objection de croissanc <1%) | 17 |
| Ifop | 20–23 May 2024 | 1,356 | 1 | 0.5 | 2 | 7 | <0.5 | 15 | 5 | – | <0.5 | – | <0.5 | 0.5 | 0.5 | – | 2 | 16 | 1 | | – | 7.5 | – | 0.5 | 1 | 33 | 6 | 1.5 | 17 |
| Cluster17 | 21–22 May 2024 | 1,043 | 1 | 0.5 | 2 | 8 | 0.5 | 14 | 5 | – | 1 | – | – | 0.5 | 0.5 | – | 2 | 16 | 1.5 | | – | 6.5 | – | 1.5 | 1.5 | 29 | 6 | 3 | 13 |
| OpinionWay | 21–22 May 2024 | 1,067 | 1 | 2 | 2 | 7 | – | 13 | 5 | – | – | – | – | – | – | – | 1 | 16 | 1 | | – | 8 | – | 1 | 1 | 32 | 7 | 3 | 16 |
| Ifop | 20–22 May 2024 | 1,344 | 1 | 0.5 | 2 | 7.5 | 0.5 | 15 | 5.5 | – | <0.5 | – | <0.5 | 0.5 | 0.5 | – | 1.5 | 16 | 1 | | – | 7.5 | – | 1 | 1 | 32.5 | 6 | 0.5 | 16.5 |
| Vivavoice | 20–21 May 2024 | 1,059 | 0.5 | 0.5 | 1 | 6.5 | <0.5 | 14 | 7 | – | <0.5 | – | 0.5 | 1 | – | – | 1.5 | 17 | 1.5 | | – | 6.5 | – | 1 | 1 | 32 | 6 | 2 | 15 |
| Ifop | 19–21 May 2024 | 1,344 | 1 | <0.5 | 2 | 7.5 | 0.5 | 15 | 5.5 | – | 0.5 | – | <0.5 | 0.5 | 0.5 | – | 1.5 | 16.5 | 1 | | – | 7.5 | – | 1 | 1 | 32 | 6 | 0.5 | 15.5 |
| Elabe | 15–17 May 2024 | 1,398 | 1 | 0.5 | 1.5 | 7.5 | <0.5 | 13 | 7.5 | – | 0.5 | – | – | 1 | – | – | 1 | 15.5 | 1 | | – | 7.5 | – | 1 | 1 | 32 | 5.5 | 3 | 16.5 |
| Ifop | 15–17 May 2024 | 1,334 | 0.5 | 0.5 | 2.5 | 7 | 1 | 14.5 | 5.5 | – | 0.5 | – | 0.5 | 1 | 0.5 | – | 1.5 | 16.5 | 1 | | – | 8 | – | <0.5 | <0.5 | 32 | 6 | 1 | 15.5 |
| Harris Interactive | 15–17 May 2024 | 2,014 | 0.5 | 0.5 | 2.5 | 8 | 0.5 | 14.5 | 5 | – | 0.5 | – | – | 0.5 | 0.5 | – | 1 | 15 | 1 | | – | 7.5 | – | 1 | 1 | 31.5 | 5.5 | 3.5 | 16.5 |
| BVA | 15–16 May 2024 | 1,500 | 1.5 | 1 | 2.5 | 8 | <0.5 | 13 | 6.5 | – | <0.5 | – | – | 1 | – | – | 2 | 17 | 1 | | <0.5 (Note: Mentré retires as of May 2) | 6 | 1 (Note: Dupont-Aignan retires as of March 26) | 1 | <0.5 | 31 | 6 | 1 | 14 |
| OpinionWay | 14–16 May 2024 | 2,025 | 1 | <1 | 2 | 7 | <1 | 14 | 6 | – | <1 | – | – | 1 | – | – | 1 | 16 | 2 | | – | 7 | – | 1 | 1 | 31 | 8 | 2 | 15 |
| Ifop | 13–16 May 2024 | 1,338 | 0.5 | 0.5 | 2.5 | 7 | 1 | 14.5 | 5.5 | – | <0.5 | – | 0.5 | 1 | – | – | 2 | 16.5 | 1.5 | | – | 8 | – | 0.5 | 0.5 | 32 | 5.5 | 0.5 | 15.5 |
| OpinionWay | 14–15 May 2024 | 1,006 | 1 | <1 | 2 | 8 | <1 | 14 | 6 | – | <1 | – | – | <1 | – | – | 1 | 16 | 2 | | – | 7 | – | <1 | 1 | 31 | 8 | 3 | 15 |
| Cluster17 | 13–15 May 2024 | 1,285 | 0.5 | 0.5 | 2.5 | 8 | 1 | 14 | 5.5 | – | 0.5 | – | – | 1 | 0.5 | – | 1.5 | 15.5 | 1.5 | | – | 6 | – | 1.5 | 1.5 | 29.5 | 6 | 2.5 | 14 |
| Ifop | 11–15 May 2024 | 1,348 | 0.5 | 0.5 | 2.5 | 7.5 | 0.5 | 14 | 5.5 | – | 0.5 | – | – | 0.5 | – | – | 2 | 16.5 | 1.5 | | – | 8 | – | 0.5 | 1 | 32.5 | 5.5 | 0.5 | 16 |
| YouGov | 6–15 May 2024 | 1,028 | 1 | <1 | 2 | 6 | 1 | 13 | 5 | – | <1 (Note: PRG and Bernard Cazeneuve's The Convention) | | – | 2 | – | – | 1 | 17 | 2 | | <1 | 6 | – | 2 | 2 | 32 | 6 | 2 | 15 |
| Ipsos | 13–14 May 2024 | 1,530 | 0.5 | 0.5 | 2 | 8 | <0.5 | 14.5 | 6.5 | – | 0.5 | – | – | 1.5 | – | – | 1 | 16 | 1.5 | | – | 7 | – | 1 | 1 | 31 | 6 | 1.5 | 15 |
| Ifop | 10–14 May 2024 | 1,348 | 0.5 | <0.5 | 2.5 | 7.5 | <0.5 | 14 | 6 | – | <0.5 | – | – | 0.5 | – | – | 1.5 | 17 | 1.5 | | – | 8 | – | 1 | 1 | 32.5 | 6 | 0.5 | 15.5 |
| Harris Interactive | 10–13 May 2024 | 2,294 | 0.5 | 0.5 | 3 | 8 | 0.5 | 14 | 5.5 | – | 0.5 | – | – | 1 | 0.5 | – | 1 | 15 | 2 | | – | 7 | – | 1 | 1 | 31.5 | 5 | 2.5 | 16.5 |
| Ifop | 9–13 May 2024 | 1,348 | 0.5 | 0.5 | 2.5 | 8 | <0.5 | 14 | 6 | – | <0.5 | – | – | 0.5 | – | – | 1 | 17 | 1 | | – | 7.5 | – | 1 | 1 | 32.5 | 6 | 1 | 15.5 |
| Ifop | 6–10 May 2024 | 1,325 | 0.5 | 0.5 | 2.5 | 8.5 | 0.5 | 13.5 | 6.5 | – | 0.5 | – | – | 1 | – | – | 1 | 17 | 1.5 | | – | 7.5 | – | 1 | 1 | 32 | 6.5 | 0.5 | 15 |
| Cluster17 | 6–9 May 2024 | 1,208 | 0.5 | 0.5 | 2 | 8.5 | 0.5 | 13 | 6 | – | 0.5 | – | – | 1 | 0.5 | – | 2 | 15.5 | 1.5 | | – | 6.5 | – | 1.5 | 1.5 | 29.5 | 6 | 3 | 14 |
| Ifop | 5–9 May 2024 | 1,325 | 0.5 | 0.5 | 2.5 | 8.5 | 0.5 | 13 | 6.5 | – | 0.5 | – | – | 1 | – | – | 1 | 17 | 1.5 | | – | 7.5 | – | 1 | 1 | 31.5 | 6.5 | 0.5 | 14.5 |
| OpinionWay | 6–7 May 2024 | 1,029 | 1 | <1 | 3 | 6 | <1 | 14 | 6 | – | <1 | – | – | 1 | – | – | 1 | 17 | 2 | | – | 6 | – | 1 | 1 | 30 | 8 | 3 | 13 |
| Ifop | 3–7 May 2024 | 1,325 | 0.5 | 0.5 | 2.5 | 8.5 | 0.5 | 13 | 6.5 | – | 0.5 | – | – | 1 | – | – | 1 | 16.5 | 1.5 | | – | 8 | – | 1 | 1 | 31.5 | 6 | 0.5 | 15 |
| OpinionWay | 5–6 May 2024 | 1,026 | 1 | <1 | 3 | 7 | <1 | 14 | 7 | – | <1 | – | – | 1 | – | – | <1 | 16 | 1 | | – | 7 | – | 1 | 1 | 31 | 7 | 3 | 15 |
| Ifop | 2–6 May 2024 | 1,325 | 0.5 | 0.5 | 3 | 8 | 0.5 | 13 | 6.5 | – | 0.5 | – | – | 1 | – | – | 1.5 | 16 | 1 | | – | 8 | – | 0.5 | 1 | 32 | 6 | 0.5 | 16 |
| Elabe | 30 Apr – 3 May 2024 | 1,375 | 1 | 0.5 | 2 | 8.5 | 0.5 | 12 | 8 | – | <0.5 | – | – | 1.5 | – | – | 1 | 16.5 | 1 | | <0.5 | 6.5 | – | 0.5 | 1 | 32 | 5 | 2.5 | 15.5 |
| Harris Interactive | 30 Apr – 3 May 2024 | 2,043 | 0.5 | 0.5 | 2.5 | 8.5 | 0.5 | 14 | 5.5 | – | 0.5 | – | – | 1 | 0.5 | – | 1 | 15 | 2 | | <0.5 | 7 | – | 1 | 1 | 31 | 5.5 | 2.5 | 16 |
| Ifop | 30 Apr – 3 May 2024 | 1,345 | 0.5 | 0.5 | 3 | 7.5 | 0.5 | 13.5 | 6.5 | – | <0.5 | – | – | 1 | – | – | 2 | 16.5 | 1 | | <0.5 | 7.5 | – | 0.5 | 1 | 31.5 | 6.5 | 0.5 | 15 |
| OpinionWay | 29–30 Apr 2024 | 1,075 | <1 | – | 2 | 6 | <1 | 14 | 7 | – | <1 | – | – | 1 | – | – | 1 | 17 | 2 | | <1 | 7 | – | 1 | 2 | 31 | 7 | 3 | 14 |
| Ifop | 29 Apr – 2 May 2024 | 1,375 | <0.5 | 0.5 | 3 | 7.5 | 0.5 | 13.5 | 7 | – | <0.5 | – | – | 1 | – | – | 1.5 | 16.5 | 1.5 | | <0.5 | 7.5 | – | 1 | 1 | 31 | 6.5 | 0.5 | 14.5 |
| Cluster17 | 29 Apr – 1 May 2024 | 1,337 | 1 | 0.5 | 2.5 | 8 | 0.5 | 13 | 6 | – | 0.5 | – | – | 0.5 | 0.5 | – | 2 | 15.5 | 1.5 | | 0.5 | 6 | – | 1 | 2 | 29.5 | 5.5 | 2 | 14 |
| OpinionWay | 29–30 Apr 2024 | 1,009 | 1 | – | 4 | 7 | <1 | 14 | 7 | – | 0.5 | – | – | 1 | – | – | 0.5 | 17 | 1 | | 0.5 | 7 | – | 1 | 1 | 29 | 8 | 1 | 12 |
| Ifop | 26–30 Apr 2024 | 1,360 | <0.5 | 0.5 | 3 | 7 | 0.5 | 14 | 7 | – | 0.5 | – | – | 1 | – | – | 1 | 16 | 1.5 | | 0.5 | 7.5 | – | 0.5 | 1 | 31.5 | 6.5 | 0.5 | 15.5 |
| Harris Interactive | 24–26 Apr 2024 | 2,319 | 0.5 | 0.5 | 2 | 9 | <0.5 | 13 | 6 | – | 0.5 | – | – | 0.5 | 0.5 | – | 1 | 16 | 2 | | <0.5 | 7 | – | 1 | 1 | 31 | 6 | 2 | 15 |
| Ifop | 25–29 Apr 2024 | 1,345 | <0.5 | 0.5 | 2.5 | 7 | <0.5 | 14.5 | 7.5 | – | 0.5 | – | – | 1 | – | – | 1.5 | 16 | 1.5 | | 0.5 | 8 | – | 0.5 | 0.5 | 31.5 | 6 | 0.5 | 15.5 |
| Odoxa | 25–26 Apr 2024 | 1,005 | 1.5 | 1 | 2.5 | 7 | <0.5 | 12 | 7 | – | 0.5 | – | – | 1.5 | – | – | 1.5 | 15.5 | 1.5 | | <0.5 | 8 | – | 1 | 1.5 | 32 | 5.5 | 0.5 | 16.5 |
| BVA | 25–26 Apr 2024 | 1,434 | 1 | 1 | 1.5 | 6.5 | – | 13 | 8 | – | <0.5 | – | – | 1.5 | – | – | 3 | 17 | 1 | | <0.5 | 6 | 1 | 1 | 1 | 31 | 5.5 | 1 | 14 |
| Ifop | 23–26 Apr 2024 | 1,345 | 0.5 | 0.5 | 2 | 7.5 | <0.5 | 14 | 8 | – | 0.5 | – | – | 1 | – | – | 1.5 | 16.5 | 1 | | 0.5 | 8 | – | 0.5 | 0.5 | 31.5 | 5.5 | 0.5 | 15 |
| OpinionWay | 24–25 Apr 2024 | 1,011 | 1 | – | 3 | 6 | <1 | 14 | 6 | – | <1 | – | – | 1 | – | – | 1 | 18 | 1 | | <1 | 7 | – | 1 | 2 | 29 | 8 | 3 | 11 |
| Cluster17 | 23–25 Apr 2024 | 1,164 | 0.5 | 0.5 | 3 | 8 | 1 | 12.5 | 6.5 | – | 1 | – | – | 0.5 | 1 | – | 2 | 16 | 2 | | 0.5 | 6 | – | 1 | 1.5 | 29.5 | 6 | 2 | 13.5 |
| Ifop | 22–25 Apr 2024 | 1,350 | 0.5 | 0.5 | 2.5 | 7.5 | 0.5 | 13 | 8 | – | <0.5 | – | – | 1.5 | – | – | 1 | 17.5 | 1 | | 0.5 | 8 | – | 0.5 | <0.5 | 31 | 5.5 | 1 | 13.5 |
| OpinionWay | 23–24 Apr 2024 | 1,007 | 1 | – | 3 | 8 | <1 | 13 | 7 | – | <1 | – | – | 1 | – | – | 2 | 18 | 2 | | <1 | 6 | – | 1 | 1 | 30 | 6 | 1 | 12 |
| Ifop | 20–24 Apr 2024 | 1,335 | 0.5 | 0.5 | 2.5 | 7 | 0.5 | 12.5 | 7.5 | – | <0.5 | – | – | 1.5 | – | – | 1.5 | 17.5 | 1.5 | | 0.5 | 8.5 | – | <0.5 | 0.5 | 31 | 5.5 | 1 | 13.5 |
| Ipsos | 19–24 Apr 2024 | 10,651 | 0.5 | 1 | 2.5 | 7 | 0.5 | 14 | 6.5 | – | 0.5 | – | – | 1 | – | – | 1 | 17 | 1 | | <0.5 | 6.5 | – | 1 | 1 | 32 | 5.5 | 1.5 | 15 |
| Ifop | 19–23 Apr 2024 | 1,335 | 0.5 | 0.5 | 2.5 | 7 | 0.5 | 12 | 7.5 | – | 0.5 | – | – | 2 | – | – | 1.5 | 17 | 1 | | 0.5 | 8 | – | 0.5 | 0.5 | 31.5 | 5.5 | 1 | 14.5 |
| Harris Interactive | 19–22 Apr 2024 | 2,319 | 0.5 | 0.5 | 3 | 8 | <0.5 | 13 | 6 | – | 0.5 | – | – | 0.5 | 0.5 | – | 1 | 16 | 2 | | 0.5 | 7 | – | 1 | 1 | 31 | 6 | 1.5 | 15 |
| Ifop | 18–22 Apr 2024 | 1,339 | 0.5 | 0.5 | 2 | 7 | 0.5 | 12 | 7.5 | – | 0.5 | – | – | 2 | – | – | 2 | 17 | 1 | | 1 | 8 | – | <0.5 | 1 | 31.5 | 5.5 | 0.5 | 14.5 |
| Ifop | 16–19 Apr 2024 | 1,371 | 0.5 | 0.5 | 2 | 8 | 0.5 | 11.5 | 7.5 | – | 0.5 | – | – | 1.5 | – | – | 2 | 17.5 | 1 | | 0.5 | 8 | – | <0.5 | 1 | 31.5 | 5.5 | 0.5 | 14 |
| OpinionWay | 17–18 Apr 2024 | 1,021 | <1 | – | 3 | 7 | <1 | 13 | 7 | – | <1 | – | – | 2 | – | – | 1 | 19 | 1 | | <1 | 7 | – | 1 | 1 | 29 | 7 | 2 | 10 |
| Ifop | 15–18 Apr 2024 | 1,376 | 1 | 0.5 | 2.5 | 8 | <0.5 | 11.5 | 7.5 | – | 0.5 | – | – | 1.5 | – | – | 1.5 | 17.5 | 0.5 | | 0.5 | 8 | – | <0.5 | 1 | 32 | 5.5 | 0.5 | 14.5 |
| OpinionWay | 16–17 Apr 2024 | 1,002 | 1 | – | 4 | 8 | <1 | 12 | 6 | – | <1 | – | – | 1 | – | – | 1 | 19 | 2 | | <1 | 7 | – | 1 | 1 | 29 | 6 | 2 | 10 |
| Ifop | 13–17 Apr 2024 | 1,364 | 0.5 | 0.5 | 2.5 | 7.5 | 0.5 | 11.5 | 7.5 | – | <0.5 | – | – | 2 | – | – | 1.5 | 17.5 | 0.5 | | 0.5 | 8 | – | <0.5 | 1 | 32.5 | 5.5 | 0.5 | 15 |
| Ifop | 12–16 Apr 2024 | 1,349 | 0.5 | <0.5 | 3 | 7 | <0.5 | 12 | 7.5 | – | <0.5 | – | – | 1.5 | – | – | 1.5 | 18 | 1 | | 0.5 | 8 | – | <0.5 | 0.5 | 32.5 | 6 | 0.5 | 14.5 |
| Harris Interactive | 12–15 Apr 2024 | 2,005 | 0.5 | 0.5 | 3 | 8 | <0.5 | 14 | 6 | – | 0.5 | – | – | 0.5 | 0.5 | – | 1 | 16 | 2 | | 0.5 | 7 | – | 0.5 | 1 | 30 | 6 | 2.5 | 14 |
| Ifop | 11–15 Apr 2024 | 1,326 | 0.5 | <0.5 | 3 | 7.5 | <0.5 | 12 | 7 | – | <0.5 | – | – | 1 | – | – | 1.5 | 18 | 1 | | 0.5 | 8 | – | <0.5 | 1 | 32.5 | 6 | 0.5 | 14.5 |
| Ifop | 9–12 Apr 2024 | 1,347 | 0.5 | 0.5 | 3 | 8 | <0.5 | 12.5 | 6.5 | – | 0.5 | – | – | 1 | – | – | 1 | 18 | 1 | | <0.5 | 8.5 | – | 0.5 | 0.5 | 31.5 | 6 | 0.5 | 13.5 |
| Ipsos | 10–11 Apr 2024 | 1,500 | 1 | 0.5 | 3 | 7 | 0.5 | 13 | 7 | – | 0.5 | – | – | 1 | – | – | 1.5 | 16 | 0.5 | | 0.2 | 6.5 | – | 1 | 1 | 32 | 6.5 | 1.5 | 16 |
| Cluster17 | 9–11 Apr 2024 | 1,164 | 0.5 | 0.5 | 2.5 | 8.5 | 1 | 12 | 6 | – | 1 | – | – | 0.5 | 1 | – | 1.5 | 17 | 1 | | 0.5 | 6 | – | 1.5 | 1.5 | 29 | 6 | 2 | 12 |
| Ifop | 8–11 Apr 2024 | 1,355 | 0.5 | 0.5 | 3 | 8 | 0.5 | 12.5 | 6 | – | 0.5 | – | – | 1 | – | – | 1.5 | 18 | 0.5 | | <0.5 | 8.5 | – | 0.5 | 0.5 | 31 | 6.5 | 0.5 | 13 |
| Ifop | 6–10 Apr 2024 | 1,343 | 0.5 | 0.5 | 2.5 | 8 | 0.5 | 12 | 5.5 | – | 0.5 | – | – | 1.5 | – | – | 1 | 18.5 | 1 | | <0.5 | 8.5 | – | 0.5 | 0.5 | 31.5 | 6.5 | 0.5 | 13 |
| Ifop | 5–9 Apr 2024 | 1,335 | 1 | 0.5 | 3 | 7.5 | <0.5 | 12 | 5.5 | – | 0.5 | – | – | 1.5 | – | – | 1 | 18.5 | 0.5 | | <0.5 | 8 | – | 0.5 | 1 | 32 | 6.5 | 0.5 | 13.5 |
| YouGov | 3–9 Apr 2024 | 1,028 | 2 | – | 2 | 5 | – | 12 | 6 | – | 1 | | – | 1 | – | – | 1 | 19 | <1 | – | – | 7 | 2 | – | – | 29 | 9 | 2 | 10 |
| Harris Interactive | 5–8 Apr 2024 | 2,018 | 1 | – | 3 | 9 | – | 12 | 6 | – | 0.5 | – | – | 1 | 1 | – | 1 | 17 | 1 | | 0.5 | 7 | – | 0.5 | 0.5 | 30 | 6 | 3.5 | 13 |
| Ifop | 4–8 Apr 2024 | 1,343 | 1 | 0.5 | 3 | 7.5 | 0.5 | 11 | 6.5 | – | <0.5 | – | – | 1 | – | – | 2 | 19 | <0.5 | | <0.5 | 7.5 | – | 0.5 | 1 | 32 | 6 | 1 | 13 |
| OpinionWay | 3–5 Apr 2024 | 1,509 | 1 | – | 2 | 7 | – | 12 | 7 | – | <1 | | – | 1 | – | – | 2 | 19 | 2 | | <1 | 8 | – | 1 | – | 29 | 7 | 2 | 10 |
| Elabe | 2–4 Apr 2024 | 1,504 | 1.5 | – | 2.5 | 7.5 | – | 12 | 8.5 | – | 0.5 | – | – | 2 | – | – | 1 | 16.5 | 1 | | <0.5 | 7 | – | 0.5 | 0.5 | 30 | 5.5 | 3.5 | 13.5 |
| Harris Interactive | 28–29 Mar 2024 | 2,220 | 1 | – | 3 | 8 | – | 13 | 6 | – | 0.5 | – | – | 0.5 | 0.5 | – | 1 | 17 | 1 | | 0.5 | 7 | – | 0.5 | 1 | 31 | 6 | 2.5 | 14 |
| BVA | 27–28 Mar 2024 | 1,518 | 1 | 0.5 | 2.5 | 7 | – | 11 | 6 | – | <0.5 | – | – | 0.5 | – | <0.5 | 1 | 20 | 1 | | <0.5 | 8 | 3 | 1 | 1 | 30 | 5.5 | 1 | 10 |
| Harris Interactive | 22–25 Mar 2024 | 2,027 | 1 | – | 3 | 7 | – | 12 | 7 | – | 0.5 | – | – | 0.5 | 0.5 | – | 1 | 18 | 1 | | 0.5 | 7 | 2 | 0.5 | 0.5 | 30 | 6 | 2 | 12 |
| Ifop | 19–20 Mar 2024 | 1,112 | 0.5 | – | 3 | 6 | – | 11 | 7 | – | 0.5 | – | – | 1.5 | – | – | 1.5 | 21 | 1 | | 0.5 | 7 | 2 | 0.5 | 0.5 | 30 | 6 | 0.5 | 9 |
| Harris Interactive | 15–18 Mar 2024 | 2,124 | 1 | – | 2 | 8 | – | 13 | 7 | – | 0.5 | – | – | 0.5 | 1 | 0.5 | 1 | 18 | 1 | | 0.5 | 7 | 2 | 0.5 | 0.5 | 30 | 6 | 1 | 12 |
| OpinionWay | 13–14 Mar 2024 | 1,008 | 1 | – | 2 | 6 | – | 11 | 8 | – | 1 | | – | 1 | – | – | 1 | 20 | 1 | – | <1 | 8 | 3 | 1 | – | 27 | 6 | 3 | 7 |
| Cluster17 | 8–9 Mar 2024 | 1,016 | 0.5 | – | 3 | 8 | – | 10 | 8 | – | 0.5 | – | – | 1.5 | – | – | 1 | 17 | 2 | | 0.5 | 7 | 3 | 1 | – | 29 | 6 | 2 | 12 |
| Elabe | 5–7 Mar 2024 | 1,504 | 2 | – | 3 | 7.5 | – | 8.5 | 9.5 | – | <0.5 | – | – | 1.5 | – | – | 1.5 | 17 | 1 | – | – | 7 | 3 | 0.5 | – | 29.5 | 4.5 | 3 | 12.5 |
| YouGov | 26 Feb – 7 Mar 2024 | 1,008 | 1 | – | 2 | 6 | – | 10 | 7 | – | <1 | | – | 1 | – | – | 2 | 20 | 1 | – | – | 6 | 3 | – | – | 33 | 5 | 3 | 13 |
| Ipsos | 1–6 Mar 2024 | 11,700 | 1 | | 3.5 | 7 | – | 11.5 | 8.5 | – | 0.5 | – | – | – | – | – | 1.5 | 18 | 0.5 | – | – | 7 | 2.5 | 0.5 | 0.5 | 31 | 5 | 1.5 | 13 |
| Ipsos | 23 Feb – 5 Mar 2024 | 2,000 | – | – | 3.0 | 7 | – | 12.2 | 8.1 | – | – | – | – | – | – | – | – | 18.1 | – | – | – | 7.6 | 2.5 | – | – | 30.7 | 5.5 | 5.4 | 12.6 |
| Ifop | 29 Feb – 1 Mar 2024 | 1,348 | 1 | | 3.5 | 8 | – | 9 | 8 | – | 1 | | – | 1 | – | – | 2 | 19 | <0.5 | 1.5 | <0.5 | 8 | 1.5 | 0.5 | <0.5 | 29 | 6 | 1 | 10 |
| BVA | 27–28 Feb 2024 | 1,344 | 2 | – | 3 | 7 | – | 11 | 7 | – | <0.5 | – | – | 1.5 | – | <0.5 | 1.5 | 18 (Note: RE list led by Valérie Hayer, confirmed as candidate on February 29th) | 0.5 | 0.5 | <0.5 | 8 | 2 | 0.5 | 0.5 | 30 | 6 | 1 | 12 |
| Odoxa | 21–22 Feb 2024 | 1,005 | 1.5 | – | 1.5 | 6 | – | 11 | 8.5 | – | <0.5 | – | – | – | – | – | – | 19 (Note: RE list led by Clément Beaune) | 1 | – | – | 8.5 | 4 | – | – | 30 | 7 | 2 | 11 |
| Stack Data Strategy | 17–22 Feb 2024 | 799 | 0.5 | | 3.1 | 9.9 | – | 9.9 | 5.6 | – | 2.8 | | – | 2.6 | – | – | 1.4 | 14.5 (Note: RE list led by Julien Denormandie) | – | 1.3 | – | 4.7 | 3.1 | – | – | 31.5 | 6.5 | 3.2 | 16.0 |
| OpinionWay | 14–15 Feb 2024 | 1,009 | <1 | – | 3 | 7 | – | 10 | 8 | – | 2 | | – | 1 | – | – | <1 | 19 | 1 | – | <1 | 8 | 2 | 1 | – | 27 | 8 | 3 | 8 |
| Elabe | 7–9 Feb 2024 | 1,426 | 1.5 | – | 2.5 | 9 | – | 9 | 9.5 | – | <0.5 | – | – | 2 | – | – | 2 | 16.5 | 1 | – | – | 8 | 3 | 0.5 | – | 27.5 | 5 | 3 | 11 |
| Ifop | 7–8 Feb 2024 | 1,356 | 1.5 | | 3.5 | 7 | – | 9.5 | 8 | – | 1.5 | | – | 1.5 | – | – | 1.5 | 19 | 0.5 | 0.5 | <0.5 | 7 | 1 | 0.5 | 0.5 | 29 | 6.5 | 1.5 | 10 |
| Ifop | 7–8 Feb 2024 | 1,356 | 1 | | 3 | 7.5 | – | 10.5 | 8.5 | – | 1 | | – | 1 | – | – | 1 | 19 | 1 | 1 | <0.5 | 7.5 | 1.5 | 1 | <0.5 | 28.5 | 6 | 1.5 | 9.5 |
| Ifop | 7–8 Feb 2024 | 1,356 | 1 | | 3.5 | 8 | – | 10.5 | 8 | – | 1.5 | | – | 1.5 | – | – | 1.5 | 18 | 0.5 | 0.5 | <0.5 | 7.5 | 1.5 | 0.5 | 0.5 | 28 | 6 | 1.5 | 10 |
| YouGov | 29 Jan – 7 Feb 2024 | 1,001 | 1 | – | 2 | 8 | – | 8 | 8 | – | 1 | | – | 1 | – | – | 1 | 19 (Note: RE list led by Olivier Véran) | 1 | – | – | 6 | 2 | – | – | 32 | 8 | 3 | 13 |
| Portland | 24–31 Jan 2024 | 469 | 2 | – | 3 | 6 | – | 9 | 9 | – | 1 | – | – | – | – | – | – | 14 | 1 | – | – | 8 | 3 | – | – | 33 | 6 | 5 | 19 |
| OpinionWay | 17–18 Jan 2024 | 1,019 | 1 | – | 4 | 8 | – | 10 | 6 | – | 2 | | – | 1 | – | – | 1 | 20 | <1 | – | <1 | 8 | 2 | – | – | 27 | 7 | 3 | 7 |
| Ifop | 16–17 Jan 2024 | 1,348 | 0.5 | | 4 | 7.5 | – | 9.5 | 7 | – | 1.5 | | – | 1.5 | – | – | 1 | 19 | <0.5 | 0.5 | <0.5 | 6.5 | 2 | <0.5 | 0.5 | 31 | 7 | 1 | 12 |
| Harris Interactive | 12–15 Jan 2024 | 1,217 | 1 | – | 3 | 7 | – | 11 | 8 | – | 1 | – | – | 2 | – | – | 1 | 19 | 1 | – | – | 8 | 2.5 | – | – | 28 | 6 | 1.5 | 9 |
| Ifop | 12–15 Jan 2024 | 875 | 1 | | 4 | 6.5 | – | 9 | 9 | – | – | – | – | 1 | – | – | – | 20 | 1 | – | – | 7.5 | 3 | – | – | 30 | 6 | 2 | 10 |
| YouGov | 8–15 Jan 2024 | 1,004 | 2 | 2 | 2 | 7 | – | 8 | 9 | – | – | – | – | – | – | – | – | 20 (Note: RE list led by Stéphane Séjourné) | – | – | – | 6 | 4 | – | – | 30 | 7 | 3 | 10 |
| Cluster17 | 13–14 Jan 2024 | 1,209 | 1 | – | 3 | 7.5 | – | 11 | 8 | – | 0.5 | – | – | 1.5 | – | – | 1 | 18 | 1 | – | – | 7 | 3 | – | – | 28.5 | 7 | 2 | 10.5 |
| Elabe | 10–12 Jan 2024 | 1,400 | 1.5 | – | 3 | 7.5 | – | 9.5 | 8.5 | – | 0.5 | – | – | 1.5 | – | – | 1 | 18 | 1 | – | – | 8.5 | 2.5 | 0.5 | – | 28.5 | 5 | 3 | 10.5 |
| Ifop | 3–5 Jan 2024 | 1,090 | 0.5 | | 3 | 6 | – | 10 | 9 | – | 3 | | – | 2.5 | – | – | 1.5 | 17 | 0.5 | 0.5 | 0.5 | 8 | 2 | 0.5 | 0.5 | 28 | 6.5 | 0.5 | 11 |
| Odoxa | 13–14 Dec 2023 | 1,004 | 2.5 | – | 3 | 6.5 | – | 9 | 6 | – | 0.5 | – | – | – | – | – | – | 21 | 0.5 | – | – | 9 | 2 | – | – | 31 | 6 | 3 | 10 |
| OpinionWay | 13–14 Dec 2023 | – | 1 | – | 3 | 6 | – | 10 | 8 | – | 2 | | – | <1 | – | – | 1 | 19 | <1 | – | <1 | 9 | 3 | – | – | 27 | 8 | 3 | 8 |
| Ipsos | 29 Nov – 12 Dec 2023 | 11,691 | 1.5 | | 3 | 7.5 | – | 10.5 | 9.5 | – | 0.5 | – | – | – | – | – | – | 20 | 0.5 | – | – | 8 | 2.5 | – | – | 28 | 6.5 | 2 | 8 |
| Ifop | 8–11 Dec 2023 | 1,062 | 1.5 | | 4.5 | 7 | – | 10 | 8 | – | – | – | – | 1.5 | – | – | – | 18 | 1 | – | – | 7.5 | 2.5 | – | – | 30 | 7.5 | 1 | 12 |
| OpinionWay | 15–16 Nov 2023 | – | 2 | – | 3 | 7 | – | 9 | 8 | – | 3 | | – | <1 | – | – | 1 | 19 | <1 | – | – | 8 | 2 | – | – | 28 | 7 | 3 | 9 |
| Ipsos | 9–10 Nov 2023 | 1,412 | 2 | | 2 | 8.5 | – | 10 | 10 | – | – | – | – | – | – | – | – | 22 (Note: RE list led by Bruno Le Maire) | – | – | – | 6 | 2 | – | – | 29 | 6 | 2.5 | 7 |
| Ipsos | 9–10 Nov 2023 | 1,412 | 2 | | 2 | 8.5 | – | 10.5 | 10.5 | – | – | – | – | – | – | – | – | 20 | – | – | – | 6.5 | 2 | – | – | 29 | 6 | 3 | 9 |
| Ifop | 12–13 Oct 2023 | 1,515 | 1 | | 5 | 9 | – | 9 | 8 | – | – | – | – | 2 | – | – | – | 20 | – | – | – | 8 | 2 | – | – | 28 | 6 | 2 | 8 |
| Ifop | 12–13 Oct 2023 | 1,515 | 1 | | 5 | 9 | – | 9 | 9 | – | – | – | – | 1.5 | – | – | – | 20 (Note: RE list led by Thierry Breton) | – | – | – | 8.5 | 2.5 | – | – | 28 | 5 | 1 | 8 |
| Ifop | 30–31 Aug 2023 | 1,126 | 1 | | 5 | 10 | – | 9 | 8 | – | – | – | – | 2 | – | – | – | 21 | – | – | – | 8 | 3 | – | – | 25 | 6.5 | 1.5 | 4 |
| Ifop | 30–31 Aug 2023 | 1,126 | 2 | | 6 | 12 (Note: LFI–PS list led by Segolène Royal) | | | 10 | – | – | – | – | 2 | – | – | – | 23 | – | – | – | 9 | 3 | – | – | 25 | 7 | 2 | 2 |
| Ifop | 30–31 Aug 2023 | 1,126 | 1 | | 5 | 9 (Note: LFI list led by Segolène Royal) | – | 10 | 8 | – | – | – | – | 1.5 | – | – | – | 21 | – | – | – | 9 | 3 | – | – | 25 | 6.5 | 1 | 4 |
| Cluster17 | 16–19 Aug 2023 | 983 | 1.5 | – | 3 | 22.5 | | | | – | 2.5 | – | – | 5 | – | – | 2.5 | 20.5 | – | – | – | 7 | 3 | – | – | 23 | 7 | 2.5 | 0.5 |
| Cluster17 | 16–19 Aug 2023 | 983 | 1.5 | – | 20.5 | | | | 7.5 | – | 2.5 | – | – | 3 | – | – | 2.5 | 20 | – | – | – | 7 | 3 | – | – | 23.5 | 7 | 2 | 3 |
| Cluster17 | 16–19 Aug 2023 | 983 | 1.5 | – | 25 (Note: NUPES list led by Marie Toussaint (EELV)) | | | | | – | 2.5 | – | – | 4 | – | – | 2.5 | 20 | – | – | – | 7.5 | 4 | – | – | 24 | 7 | 2 | 1 |
| Cluster17 | 16–19 Aug 2023 | 983 | 1 | – | 25 (Note: NUPES list led by Manon Aubry (LFI)) | | | | | – | 3 | – | – | 4 | – | – | 3 | 20 | – | – | – | 7.5 | 3.5 | – | – | 24 | 7 | 1.5 | 1 |
| Cluster17 | 16–19 Aug 2023 | 983 | 2 | – | 23 (Note: NUPES list led by Léon Deffontaines (PCF)) | | | | | – | 3 | – | – | 4.5 | – | – | 3 | 21 | – | – | – | 7.5 | 3 | – | – | 24 | 7 | 2 | 1 |
| Cluster17 | 16–19 Aug 2023 | 983 | 2 | – | 25 (Note: NUPES list led by Olivier Faure (PS)) | | | | | – | 2.5 | – | – | 4.5 | – | – | 2.5 | 20 | – | – | – | 7 | 4 | – | – | 24 | 7 | 1.5 | 1 |
| Ifop | 4–5 Jul 2023 | 1,008 | 1 | | 4 | 8 | – | 9 | 9 | – | – | – | – | – | – | – | – | 20 | – | – | – | 11 | 4 | – | – | 26 | 7 | 1 | 6 |
| Ipsos | 16–26 Jun 2023 | 10,631 | 1.5 | | 4 | 8.5 | – | 10 | 10 | – | – | – | – | – | – | – | – | 21 | – | – | – | 9 | 2.5 | – | – | 24 | 6.5 | 3 | 3 |
| Ipsos | 16–26 Jun 2023 | 10,631 | 2 | | 24 | | | | | – | – | – | – | – | – | – | – | 24 | – | – | – | 10 | 3 | – | – | 25 | 7 | 5 | 1 |
| Ipsos | 16–26 Jun 2023 | 10,631 | 1.5 | | 5 | 9.5 | – | 15 | | – | – | – | – | – | – | – | – | 23 | – | – | – | 9 | 2.5 | – | – | 25 | 6.5 | 3 | 2 |
| Elabe | 19–21 Jun 2023 | 1,397 | 1.5 | | 2 | 8.5 | – | 9.5 | 11 | – | – | – | – | – | – | – | – | 22.5 | – | – | – | 8.5 | 2.5 | – | – | 26 | 5.5 | 2.5 | 3.5 |
| Elabe | 19–21 Jun 2023 | 1,397 | 1.5 | | 24.5 | | | | | – | – | – | – | – | – | – | – | 26 | – | – | – | 9 | 2.5 | – | – | 27 | 5.5 | 4 | 1 |
| Cluster17 | 17–19 May 2023 | 1,760 | 2 | | 4 | 11 | – | 9 | 11 | – | – | – | – | – | – | – | – | 19.5 | – | – | – | 7.5 | 3 | – | – | 24 | 6.5 | 3.5 | 4.5 |
| Cluster17 | 17–19 May 2023 | 1,760 | 2 | | 27 | | | | | – | – | – | – | – | – | – | – | 23 | – | – | – | 8.5 | 4 | – | – | 25.5 | 7 | 3 | 1.5 |
| Ifop | 10–11 May 2023 | 1,310 | 1 | | 5 | 10 | – | 10 | 10 | – | – | – | – | – | – | – | – | 19 | – | – | – | 8 | 3 | – | – | 25 | 6 | 3 | 6 |
| Ifop | 10–11 May 2023 | 1,310 | 2 | | 26 (Note: NUPES list led by LFI and EELV) | | | | | – | – | – | – | – | – | – | – | 22 | – | – | – | 11 | 3 | – | – | 26 | 6 | 4 | Tie |
| Harris Interactive | 5–9 May 2023 | 1,262 | 2 | | 23 (Note: NUPES list led by EELV) | | | | | – | – | – | – | – | – | – | 3 | 26 | – | – | – | 13 | 2 | – | – | 21 | 5 | 5 | 3 |
| Harris Interactive | 5–9 May 2023 | 1,262 | 1 | | 19 | | | | | 5 | – | 6 | – | – | – | – | 3 | 24 | – | – | – | 12 | 2 | – | – | 20 | 5 | 3 | 4 |
| Harris Interactive | 5–9 May 2023 | 1,262 | 1 | | 3 | 9 | – | 10 | 11 | – | – | – | – | – | – | – | 1 | 23 | – | – | – | 12 | 2 | – | – | 20 | 5 | 3 | 3 |
| 2019 European election | 26 May 2019 | – | 0.8 | (Note: endorsed LO) | 2.5 | 6.3 | 6.2 | | 13.5 | 1.8 (Note: with MEI and MdP) | (Note: with PS) | – | 0.1 | (Note: with EELV) | – | 0.1 | 2.2 | 24.9 (Note: incl. UDI with 2.50%) | – | – | – | 8.5 | 3.5 | 1.2 | 0.6 | 23.3 | – | 7.0 | 0.9 |

=== Germany ===
| Polling firm | Fieldwork date | Sample size | Union EPP | Grüne G/EFA | SPD S&D | AfD NI | Linke Left | FDP Renew | PARTEI NI | FW Renew | Tiersch. Left | ÖDP G/EFA | FAM EPP | Volt G/EFA | PIRAT G/EFA | BSW NI | Others | Lead |
|---|---|---|---|---|---|---|---|---|---|---|---|---|---|---|---|---|---|---|
| Wahlkreisprognose | 6–7 Jun 2024 | 1,000 | 30 | 13.5 | 12.5 | 15.5 | 2.5 | 4.5 | — | 2.5 | — | — | — | — | — | 7.5 | 11.5 | 14.5 |
| Wahlkreisprognose | 4–6 Jun 2024 | 1,300 | 31 | 14.5 | 14.5 | 14 | 2.5 | 4 | — | 2 | — | — | — | — | — | 6.5 | 11 | 16.5 |
| Forschungsgruppe Wahlen | 5–6 Jun 2024 | 1,223 | 30 | 14 | 14 | 14 | 3 | 4 | — | — | — | — | — | 3 | — | 7 | 13 | 16 |
| Ipsos | 29 May–5 Jun 2024 | 2,000 | 30 | 15 | 15 | 14 | 3 | 5 | — | 3 | — | — | — | — | — | 7 | 8 | 15 |
| Wahlkreisprognose | 27 May – 1 Jun 2024 | 2,000 | 30.5 | 15 | 13.5 | 15 | 3 | 4 | 1.5 | 2.5 | 1.5 | — | — | — | — | 6 | 7.5 | 15.5 |
| INSA | 30–31 May 2024 | 1,001 | 29 | 13 | 14 | 16 | 3 | 4 | — | 3 | — | — | — | — | — | 7 | 11 | 13 |
| Forschungsgruppe Wahlen | 27–29 May 2024 | 1,197 | 30 | 15 | 14 | 14 | 4 | 4 | — | — | — | — | — | — | — | 6 | 13 | 15 |
| Infratest dimap | 27–29 May 2024 | 1,515 | 29 | 14 | 15 | 14 | 3 | 4 | — | 3 | — | — | — | — | — | 6 | 12 | 14 |
| INSA | 23–24 May 2024 | 1,002 | 30 | 13 | 14 | 17 | 3 | 4 | — | 3 | — | — | — | — | — | 7 | 9 | 13 |
| Wahlkreisprognose | 13–21 May 2024 | 2,600 | 31 | 15 | 12.5 | 16 | 3 | 3.5 | 1.5 | 2.5 | 2 | — | — | — | — | 6.5 | 6.5 | 15 |
| Forschungsgruppe Wahlen | 14–16 May 2024 | 1,247 | 31 | 15 | 14 | 15 | 3 | 4 | — | — | — | — | — | — | — | 5 | 13 | 16 |
| INSA | 10–13 May 2024 | 2,100 | 29 | 13 | 15.5 | 17 | 4 | 4 | — | 3 | 2 | — | — | — | — | 7 | 5.5 | 12 |
| YouGov | 3–8 May 2024 | 1,247 | 29 | 15 | 16 | 20 | 4 | 4 | — | — | — | — | — | — | — | 6 | 6 | 9 |
| Infratest dimap | 29–30 Apr 2024 | 1,323 | 30 | 15 | 14 | 15 | — | 4 | — | — | — | — | — | — | — | 7 | 15 | 15 |
| INSA | 25–26 Apr 2024 | 1,202 | 29 | 13 | 16 | 17 | 4 | 4 | — | 3 | — | — | — | — | — | 7 | 7 | 12 |
| Forschungsgruppe Wahlen | 23–25 Apr 2024 | 1,228 | 30 | 17 | 15 | 15 | 3 | 3 | — | — | — | — | — | — | — | 4 | 13 | 13 |
| Forschungsgruppe Wahlen | 9–11 Apr 2024 | 1,254 | 30 | 15 | 16 | 16 | 3 | 3 | — | — | — | — | — | — | — | 5 | 12 | 14 |
| INSA | 5–8 Apr 2024 | 2,100 | 28.5 | 11.5 | 16.5 | 19 | 4 | 5 | — | 3 | 2 | — | — | — | — | 6 | 4 | 9.5 |
| Ipsos | 23 Feb–02 Mar 2024 | 2,613 | 29 | 16 | 17 | 16 | 4 | 4 | — | — | — | — | — | — | — | 7 | 4 | 12 |
| Forsa | 12–13 Mar 2024 | 1,008 | 34 | 14 | 16 | 15 | 2 | 3 | — | 3 | — | — | — | — | — | 4 | 9 | 18 |
| INSA | 8–11 Mar 2024 | 2,100 | 28.5 | 11 | 16 | 20 | 4.5 | 6 | 1 | 2.5 | 2 | — | 0.5 | 0.5 | 0.5 | 5.5 | 1.5 | 8.5 |
| Ipsos | 23 Feb–5 Mar 2024 | 2,613 | 29 | 16 | 17 | 16 | 4 | 4 | — | 3 | — | — | — | — | — | 7 | 4 (Note: Die Partei has 2 seats, Tierschutz has one seat.) | 12 |
| Wahlkreisprognose | 24–29 Feb 2024 | 1,900 | 31.5 | 16 | 12 | 16 | 2 | 3 | 1.5 | 3.5 | 2.5 | — | — | — | — | 7.5 | 4.5 | 15.5 |
| Stack Data Strategy | 17–22 Feb 2024 | 980 | 25.5 | 9.8 | 16.5 | 15.1 | 2.7 | 6.0 | 3.2 | 4.1 | 3.1 | — | — | 1.3 | 1.2 | 9.3 | 3.4 | 9.0 |
| INSA | 8–12 Feb 2024 | 2,101 | 27 | 10.5 | 16 | 22 | 4.5 | 3 | 1 | 3.5 | 3 | — | 1 | 1 | 1 | 5.5 | 1.5 | 5 |
| Portland | 24–31 Jan 2024 | 555 | 29 | 13 | 16 | 17 | 3 | 5 | 1 | 3 | 3 | 0 | 0 | 1 | 1 | 6 | 2 | 12 |
| Wahlkreisprognose | 11–18 Jan 2024 | 1,440 | 28 | 13 | 9 | 23 | 3 | 4.5 | 1.5 | 5 | 1.5 | — | — | — | — | 7 | 4.5 | 5 |
| Wahlkreisprognose | 1–7 Dec 2023 | 1,440 | 31 | 12 | 10 | 25 | 3 | 3 | 1.5 | 2.5 | 2 | — | — | — | — | 7 | 3 | 6 |
| INSA | 31 Jul 2023 | 1,001 | 26 | 15 | 19 | 23 | 5 | 7 | — | — | — | — | — | — | — | — | 6 | 3 |
| Wahlkreisprognose | 7–14 Jul 2023 | 1,040 | 23 | 13.5 | 15 | 22 | 2.5 | 3.5 | 2 | 3 | 1.5 | — | — | — | — | 8.5 | 5.5 | 1 |
| Wahlkreisprognose | 15–16 Dec 2022 | 1,100 | 22 | 21 | 21 | 18.5 | 3.5 | 3.5 | 2 | 3.5 | 2.5 | — | — | — | — | — | 2.5 | 1 |
| Wahlkreisprognose | 24–26 Feb 2022 | 1,722 | 22 | 19.5 | 22.5 | 12.5 | 3 | 7.5 | 2.5 | 3 | 2 | — | — | — | — | — | 5.5 | 0.5 |
| 2021 federal election | 26 Sep 2021 | – | 24.2 | 14.7 | 25.7 | 10.4 | 4.9 | 11.4 | 1.0 | 2.4 | 1.5 | 0.2 | — | 0.4 | 0.4 | — | 2.9 | 1.6 |
| 2019 European election | 26 May 2019 | – | 28.9 | 20.5 | 15.8 | 11.0 | 5.5 | 5.4 | 2.4 | 2.2 | 1.4 | 1.0 | 0.7 | 0.7 | 0.7 | — | 3.8 | 8.4 |

=== Greece ===
| Polling firm/Commissioner | Fieldwork date | Sample size | ND EPP | SYRIZA Left | PASOK S&D | KKE NI | XA (Note: De facto banned, popular former XA member Ilias Kasidiaris supported Spartans for the 2023 Greek legislative election.) NI | EL ECR | MeRA25 Left | PE NI | R NI | Antarsya NI | SP NI | NIKI NI | FL PfE | NA Left | DIMO Renew | KOS G/EFA | PAT NI | Other | Lead |
|---|---|---|---|---|---|---|---|---|---|---|---|---|---|---|---|---|---|---|---|---|---|
| 2024 EP election | 9 Jun 2024 | — | 28.3 | 14.9 | 12.8 | 9.3 | – | 9.3 | 2.5 | 3.4 | – | – | – | – | – | – | – | – | – | – | 13.4 |
| GPO/Parapolitika | 4–7 Jun 2024 | 1,200 | 32.3 | 16.1 | 12.9 | 8.5 | – | 8.8 | 2.4 | 3.7 | – | – | – | – | – | – | – | – | – | – | 16.2 |
| Pulse RC/Skai | 4–6 Jun 2024 | 1,169 | 31.3 | 16.2 | 12.8 | 7.8 | – | 8.4 | 3.3 | 3.3 | – | – | – | – | – | – | – | – | – | – | 15.1 |
| MRB/Open | 4–6 Jun 2024 | 1,212 | 31.5 | 16.0 | 12.4 | 8.0 | – | 8.5 | 3.0 | 3.5 | – | – | – | – | – | – | – | – | – | – | 15.5 |
| Interview/Political | 30 May–6 Jun 2024 | 2,755 | 30.0 | 17.2 | 11.4 | 7.2 | – | 8.1 | 2.4 | 2.8 | 1.1 | – | – | – | – | – | – | – | – | – | 12.8 |
| Marc/AΝΤ1 | 3–5 Jun 2024 | 1,205 | 33.0 | 16.6 | 11.7 | 7.8 | – | 8.4 | 2.8 | 4.3 | – | – | – | – | – | – | – | – | – | – | 16.4 |
| Good Affairs/To Vima | 2–5 Jun 2024 | 2,048 | 32.1 | 16.7 | 12.1 | 8.1 | – | 8.0 | 2.5 | 2.8 | – | – | – | – | – | – | – | – | – | – | 15.4 |
| Metron Analysis/Mega | 28 May–5 Jun 2024 | 1,606 | 32.0 | 15.5 | 12.0 | 7.5 | – | 8.5 | 3.0 | 4.5 | – | – | – | – | – | – | – | – | – | – | 16.5 |
| Alco/Alpha | 2–4 Jun 2024 | 1,000 | 31.1 | 15.2 | 12.7 | 8.0 | – | 8.6 | 3.5 | 3.1 | – | – | – | – | – | – | – | – | – | – | 15.9 |
| Prorata/Attica | 29 May–4 Jun 2024 | 1,000 | 32.4 | 13.7 | 13.2 | 9.3 | – | 9.3 | 2.8 | 4.4 | – | – | – | – | – | – | – | – | – | – | 18.7 |
| Interview/Politic | 30 May–3 Jun 2024 | 2,005 | 33.8 | 16.7 | 11.1 | 7.8 | – | 7.8 | 4.4 | 2.8 | – | – | – | – | – | – | – | – | – | – | 17.1 |
| Opinion Poll/Action24 | 29 May–1 Jun 2024 | 1,201 | 33.0 | 16.2 | 12.3 | 8.0 | – | 9.0 | 2.6 | 3.7 | – | – | – | – | – | – | – | – | – | – | 16.8 |
| Marc/Proto Thema | 29–31 May 2024 | 1,003 | 34.5 | 16.7 | 11.9 | 7.3 | – | 8.4 | 2.7 | 4.2 | – | – | – | – | – | – | – | – | – | – | 17.8 |
| Pulse RC/Skai | 27–30 May 2024 | 1,203 | 32.0 | 16.5 | 13.0 | 7.5 | – | 8.5 | 3.5 | 3.5 | – | – | – | – | – | – | – | – | – | – | 15.5 |
| MARC/ANT1 | 27–30 May 2024 | 1,207 | 33.4 | 16.5 | 11.8 | 7.6 | – | 8.8 | 3.0 | 4.6 | – | – | – | – | – | – | – | – | – | – | 16.9 |
| GPO/Star | 27–29 May 2024 | 1,200 | 33.1 | 16.2 | 13.2 | 8.2 | – | 8.4 | 2.0 | 3.5 | – | – | – | – | – | – | – | – | – | – | 16.9 |
| Prorata/Attica | 22–28 May 2024 | 1,000 | 33.3 | 12.0 | 13.0 | 11.2 | – | 8.5 | 1.7 | 3.9 | – | – | – | – | – | – | – | – | – | – | 20.3 |
| Metron Analysis/Mega | 20–24 May 2024 | 1,311 | 31.0 | 15.7 | 12.9 | 7.9 | – | 7.3 | 3.3 | 4.2 | – | – | – | – | – | – | – | – | – | – | 15.3 |
| Good Affairs/Dailypost | 18–25 May 2024 | 1,000 | 31.1 | 16.3 | 11.1 | 7.8 | – | 8.1 | 1.6 | 3.0 | – | – | – | – | – | – | – | – | – | – | 14.8 |
| Opinion Poll/Action24 | 15–16 May 2024 | 1,006 | 33.3 | 15.5 | 12.1 | 8.3 | – | 9.9 | 2.3 | 3.8 | – | – | – | – | – | – | – | – | – | – | 17.8 |
| GPO/Parapolitika | 13–16 May 2024 | 1,200 | 33.3 | 15.6 | 13.2 | 8.6 | – | 8.6 | 2.2 | 3.2 | – | – | – | – | – | – | – | – | – | – | 17.7 |
| Alco/Alpha | 13–15 May 2024 | 1,000 | 32.5 | 16.0 | 13.0 | 9.0 | — | 10.0 | 2.2 | 3.3 | — | — | — | 3.5 | 2.4 | 2.9 | 2.5 | — | — | 3.0 | 16.5 |
| Pulse RC/Skai | 13–15 May 2024 | 1,104 | 33.0 | 16.0 | 12.5 | 8.0 | — | 9.0 | 3.0 | 3.5 | — | — | — | 3.5 | 2.4 | 3.0 | 2.1 | — | 1.2 | 2.8 | 17.0 |
| MARC/ANT1 | 10–15 May 2024 | 1,209 | 33.8 | 15.2 | 12.2 | 8.0 | — | 8.3 | 3.0 | 4.5 | — | — | — | 3.2 | 2.8 | 3.0 | 2.5 | — | — | 3.3 | 18.6 |
| MRB/Open | 10–14 May 2024 | 1,100 | 32.3 | 16.0 | 14.0 | 8.0 | — | 9.9 | 2.2 | 3.4 | — | — | — | 2.9 | 2.8 | 3.8 | 2.4 | — | — | 2.2 | 16.3 |
| Interview/Politic | 8–13 May 2024 | 2,405 | 33.3 | 17.2 | 12.2 | 6.7 | — | 7.8 | 2.6 | 2.7 | 1.6 | — | — | 3.4 | 2.7 | 5.0 | 2.6 | — | — | 11.8 | 16.1 |
| Good Affairs/To Vima | — | — | 31.8 | 16.1 | 11.8 | 8.3 | — | 10.3 | 2.3 | 3.1 | — | — | — | 4.2 | 2.1 | 2.8 | 2.6 | 1.1 | — | | 15.7 |
| Marc/Proto Thema | 18–25 Apr 2024 | 1,049 | 33.4 | 14.7 | 11.4 | 8.5 | — | 9.8 | 2.4 | 5.4 | — | — | 2.4 | 3.4 | 2.2 | 2.5 | 1.7 | — | — | 2.2 | 18.7 |
| GPO/Parapolitika | 17–22 Apr 2024 | 1,400 | 33.6 | 16.3 | 13.5 | 8.8 | — | 9.1 | 2.1 | 3.1 | — | — | 2.4 | 3.4 | — | 2.7 | 2.2 | — | — | 2.8 | 17.3 |
| Metron Analysis/Mega | 10–16 Apr 2024 | 1,304 | 32.3 | 15.4 | 12.0 | 9.8 | — | 8.3 | 1.6 | 4.2 | — | — | 2.5 | 3.6 | 1.4 | 3.1 | 2.0 | 1.0 | — | 2.8 | 16.9 |
| Prorata/Attica | 5–10 Apr 2024 | 1,000 | 29.5 | 15.0 | 12.7 | 9.2 | — | 9.8 | 2.3 | 4.6 | — | — | 1.7 | 3.5 | 1.7 | 4.0 | 1.7 | 1.2 | — | 3.0 | 14.5 |
| Opinion Poll/Action 24 | 8–10 Apr 2024 | 1,006 | 32.1 | 15.0 | 12.4 | 8.5 | — | 10.7 | 1.3 | 3.7 | — | — | 2.6 | 3.7 | 1.4 | 3.2 | 3.0 | — | — | 2.3 | 17.1 |
| Interview/Politic | 4–8 Apr 2024 | 2,355 | 27.7 | 16.1 | 12.7 | 6.9 | — | 11.8 | 2.4 | 2.8 | 1.7 | — | 1.2 | 4.3 | 2.3 | 4.7 | 2.2 | — | — | 3.2 | 11.6 |
| Alco/Alpha | 2–5 Apr 2024 | 1,000 | 29.9 | 14.3 | 13.3 | 9.4 | — | 9.6 | 2.3 | 4.1 | — | — | 2.7 | 4.2 | 1.4 | 3.0 | 2.2 | — | — | 3.5 | 15.6 |
| Palmos Analysis/Eleftheros Typos | 1–4 Apr 2024 | 1,008 | 31.8 | 14.1 | 13.0 | 9.4 | — | 10.3 | — | 4.2 | — | — | 3.3 | 3.5 | — | 4.0 | — | — | — | 6.6 | 17.7 |
| GPO/Parapolitika | 1–3 Apr 2024 | 1,000 | 33.4 | 15.9 | 14.2 | 9.0 | — | 9.5 | 1.8 | 3.0 | — | — | 2.2 | 3.3 | — | 2.2 | 2.2 | — | — | 3.3 | 17.5 |
| MRB/Open | 1–3 Apr 2024 | 1,000 | 31.5 | 15.9 | 13.4 | 8.1 | — | 9.9 | 1.9 | 4.3 | — | — | 2.1 | 3.6 | 1.8 | 3.8 | 1.6 | — | — | 2.3 | 15.6 |
| Pulse RC/Skai | 1–3 Apr 2024 | 1,105 | 33.0 | 15.0 | 12.5 | 8.5 | — | 9.0 | 2.5 | 3.5 | — | — | 3.0 | 3.5 | 1.8 | 3.0 | 1.8 | — | — | 2.9 | 18.0 |
| Opinion Poll/Action24 | 15–20 Mar 2024 | 1,010 | 34.4 | 13.4 | 12.5 | 9.4 | — | 10.1 | 1.9 | 2.9 | — | — | 2.5 | 4.3 | — | 2.9 | 2.8 | — | — | 2.8 | 21.0 |
| Metron Analysis/Mega | 12–19 Mar 2024 | 1,317 | 31.4 | 15.1 | 13.0 | 10.1 | — | 9.7 | 1.9 | 4.3 | — | 0.6 | 2.0 | 3.2 | 2.4 | 3.0 | 1.0 | 0.6 | — | 1.7 | 16.3 |
| Good Affairs/To Vima | 12–14 Mar 2024 | 3,229 | 30.8 | 13.1 | 12.9 | 8.2 | — | 9.8 | 2.2 | 2.1 | — | — | 2.2 | 3.6 | — | 2.5 | 2.9 | — | — | 1.5 | 17.7 |
| Marc/Proto Thema | 11–14 Mar 2024 | 1,086 | 36.2 | 13.4 | 12.6 | 9.4 | — | 9.2 | 2.4 | 3.1 | — | — | 2.6 | 2.8 | — | 2.6 | 2.1 | — | — | 3.7 | 22.8 |
| GPO/Star | 11–13 Mar 2024 | 1,200 | 34.8 | 14.3 | 13.9 | 9.5 | — | 8.0 | 2.3 | 2.9 | — | — | 1.8 | 3.4 | — | 3.0 | 2.6 | — | — | 3.5 | 20.5 |
| Interview/Politic | 7–11 Mar 2024 | 2,250 | 29.1 | 14.4 | 12.4 | 7.1 | — | 12.0 | — | 2.5 | — | — | 1.8 | 4.6 | — | 4.9 | — | — | — | 11.3 | 14.7 |
| Alco/Alpha | 1–6 Mar 2024 | 1,000 | 32.8 | 12.7 | 14.1 | 10.8 | — | 7.9 | 2.8 | 3.6 | — | — | 2.9 | 4.5 | — | 3.4 | — | — | — | 4.0 | 18.7 |
| Ipsos/Euronews | 23 Feb–5 Mar 2024 | 1,000 | 35.0 | 13.6 | 13.4 | 9.0 | — | 8.7 | <3.0 | 3.2 | — | — | 2.9 | 4.0 | — | 3.3 | — | — | — | 3.9 | 21.4 |
| Pulse RC/Skai | 27 Feb–1 Mar 2024 | 1,106 | 35.5 | 14.0 | 14.0 | 9.0 | — | 8.5 | 2.5 | 3.0 | — | — | 3.0 | 4.0 | — | 3.0 | — | — | — | 3.5 | 21.5 |
| GPO/Parapolitika | 26–29 Feb 2024 | 1,000 | 36.4 | 13.5 | 14.4 | 10.7 | — | 8.2 | 2.4 | 2.7 | — | — | 2.2 | 3.4 | — | 2.9 | — | — | — | 3.2 | 22.0 |
| Opinion Poll/Action24 | 21–27 Feb 2024 | 1,504 | 33.9 | 11.9 | 13.9 | 10.1 | — | 10.2 | 2.6 | 3.5 | — | — | 2.7 | 4.2 | — | 3.3 | — | — | — | 3.7 | 20.0 |
| Opinion Poll/Action24 | 13–16 Feb 2024 | 1,004 | 34.3 | 12.5 | 14.6 | 9.4 | — | 9.5 | 2.4 | 3.7 | — | — | 2.7 | 3.8 | — | 3.3 | — | — | — | 3.8 | 19.7 |
| Interview/Politic | 6–12 Feb 2024 | 2,155 | 33.3 | 14.2 | 12.8 | 8.3 | — | 9.1 | — | 2.6 | — | — | 2.1 | 5.1 | — | 5.1 | — | — | — | 9.7 | 19.1 |
| Alco/Alpha | 1–7 Feb 2024 | 1,201 | 34.5 | 12.6 | 15.0 | 11.2 | — | 7.5 | 2.2 | 3.1 | — | — | 2.8 | 3.9 | — | 2.6 | — | — | — | 4.3 | 19.5 |
| GPO/Star | 20–25 Jan 2024 | 1,100 | 38.8 | 14.0 | 14.2 | 9.6 | — | 7.2 | 2.7 | 2.6 | — | — | 2.2 | 3.3 | — | 3.0 | — | — | — | 2.4 | 24.6 |
| MRB/Open | 22–24 Jan 2024 | 1,000 | 36.1 | 12.1 | 12.1 | 9.3 | — | 9.5 | 2.8 | 4.0 | — | — | 2.8 | 3.7 | — | 2.7 | — | — | — | 4.8 | 24.0 |
| Marc/Ant1 | 17–23 Jan 2024 | 1,092 | 37.1 | 12.6 | 16.8 | 9.4 | — | 7.0 | 2.9 | 3.0 | — | — | 3.1 | 3.1 | — | 2.4 | — | — | — | 2.6 | 20.3 |
| Interview/Politic | 10–15 Jan 2024 | 2,388 | 31.5 | 14.1 | 14.2 | 10.8 | — | 8.0 | — | 2.3 | — | — | 2.6 | 5.2 | — | 4.1 | — | — | — | 7.2 | 17.3 |
| Prorata/Attica | 5–9 Jan 2024 | 1,000 | 36.6 | 12.8 | 15.9 | 11.0 | — | 6.1 | 1.8 | 3.0 | — | — | 3.7 | 3.7 | — | 3.7 | — | — | — | 1.8 | 20.7 |
| Alco/Alpha | 2–5 Jan 2024 | 1,002 | 35.3 | 13.8 | 14.3 | 11.3 | — | 6.9 | 2.4 | 3.3 | — | — | 3.2 | 3.3 | — | 2.7 | — | — | — | 3.6 | 21.0 |
| Interview/Politic | 4–8 Dec 2023 | 2,356 | 34.0 | 16.1 | 14.4 | 7.9 | — | 7.6 | — | 3.0 | — | — | 2.3 | 3.8 | — | 2.9 | — | — | — | 7.9 | 17.9 |
| GPO/Parapolitika | 5–7 Dec 2023 | 1,000 | 41.7 | 12.1 | 13.5 | 10.3 | — | 6.6 | 1.9 | 2.1 | — | — | 3.4 | 2.4 | — | 3.7 | — | — | — | 2.3 | 28.3 |
| 2019 election | 26 May 2019 | – | 33.1 | 23.8 | 7.7 | 5.4 | 4.9 | 4.2 | 3.0 (Note: 49 votes below the 3% threshold.) | 1.6 | 0.7 | 0.4 | 1.5 (Note: Alongside Union of Centrists.) | — | — | — | — | — | — | 13.7 | 9.3 |

=== Hungary ===
| Polling firm | Fieldwork date | Sample size | Fidesz-KDNP PfE | Momentum Renew | DK S&D | MSZP S&D | Párbeszéd G/EFA | LMP G/EFA | Jobbik NI | MMN EPP | MH ESN | MKKP G/EFA | MEMO EPP | NP NI | 2RK NI | TISZA EPP | Other | Lead |
|---|---|---|---|---|---|---|---|---|---|---|---|---|---|---|---|---|---|---|
| 21 Kutatóközpont | 6–8 Jun 2024 | 1,000 | 44 | 3 | 8 | | | – | – | 1 | 7 | 4 | – | – | 1 | 32 | – | 12 |
| Publicus | 3–5 June 2024 | 1,001 | 43 | 4 | 15 | | | 1 | 2 | – | 5 | 4 | – | – | – | 25 | 1 | 18 |
| Medián | 27-29 May 2024 | 1,000 | 48 | 5 | 9 | | | 0 | 1 | 1 | 6 | 2 | – | – | 1 | 29 | – | 19 |
| IDEA | 20–29 May 2024 | 1,500 | 44 | 4 | 12 | | | 0 | 0 | 1 | 5 | 4 | – | – | 2 | 26 | 2 | 18 |
| Társadalomkutató | May 2024 | 4,000 | 51 | 1 | 8 | | | 2 | 1 | 1 | 4 | 5 | – | – | 1 | 25 | – | 26 |
| Real-PR 93 | 27-29 May 2024 | 1,000 | 45 | 1 | 10 | | | – | 1 | 1 | 5 | 7 | 1 | – | 2 | 28 | – | 17 |
| Alapjogokért Központ | 22-24 May 2024 | 1,000 | 47 | 2 | 8 | | | 1 | 1 | 1 | 6 | 6 | 1 | – | 1 | 26 | – | 21 |
| Századvég | 20-28 May 2024 | 1,000 | 45 | 3 | 10 | | | 1 | 1 | 1 | 6 | 9 | – | – | 1 | 23 | – | 22 |
| Nézőpont | 20-22 May 2024 | 1,000 | 47 | 1 | 9 | | | 1 | 1 | 1 | 7 | 7 | 1 | – | 1 | 24 | – | 23 |
| Závecz Research | 2–10 May 2024 | 1,000 | 39 | 4 | 17 | | | 1 | 1 | 2 | 6 | 3 | – | – | 1 | 26 | 0 | 13 |
| IDEA | 25 Apr–4 May 2024 | 1,500 | 40 | 4 | 17 | | | 0 | 1 | 1 | 4 | 5 | – | 2 | 3 | 21 | 2 | 19 |
| Nézőpont | 29 Apr – 2 May 2024 | 1,000 | 48 | 1 | 12 | | | 1 | 1 | 1 | 5 | 7 | – | 0 | 3 | 21 | – | 27 |
| Publicus | 26–30 Apr 2024 | 1,000 | 42 | 3 | 24 | | | 1 | 1 | – | 4 | 2 | – | – | – | 23 | – | 18 |
| Medián | 26–29 Apr 2024 | 1,000 | 45 | 4 | 9 | | | 1 | 1 | 2 | 4 | 6 | – | 1 | 2 | 25 | – | 20 |
| Iránytű | 17–19 Apr 2024 | 1,073 | 50 | 3 | 10 | | | – | 1 | – | 3 | 4 | – | – | 2 | 26 | 1 | 24 |
| Iránytű | 9–12 Apr 2024 | 1,073 | 53 | 3 | 9 | | | – | 2 | – | 6 | 4 | – | – | 1 | 20 | 2 | 33 |
| Závecz Research | 4–11 Apr 2024 | 1,000 | 33 | 7 | 26 | | | 3 | 1 | – | 8 | 5 | – | – | – | 14 | 3 | 7 |
| Nézőpont | 2–4 Apr 2024 | 1,000 | 47 | 4 | 13 | | | 1 | 1 | 1 | 6 | 11 | – | 2 | 2 | 13 | 2 | 34 |
| Ipsos | 23 Feb–5 Mar 2024 | 1,025 | 47.6 | 7.2 | 16.5 | – | – | 2.6 | 2.8 | 3.0 | 9.6 | 4.2 | 2.0 | – | – | – | 4.7 | 31.1 |
| Nézőpont | 26–28 Feb 2024 | 1,000 | 47 | 7 | 14 | 2 | 2 | 2 | 2 | 4 | 8 | 8 | – | 1; 0 | 4; 0 | – | – | 33 |
| 21 Kutatóközpont | 22–26 Feb 2024 | 1,200 | 44 | 9 | 18 | 2 | 1 | 2 | 3 | 3 | 7 | 8 | – | 1 | 2 | – | – | 26 (Note: without leaders) |
| 21 Kutatóközpont | 22–26 Feb 2024 | 1,200 | 44 | 9 | 17 | 1 | 1 | 3 | 2 | 5 | 5 | 6 | – | 3 | 3 | – | – | 27 (Note: with leaders) |
| Republikon | Jun 2023 | – | 46 | 7 | 19 | 4 | 6 | | 6 | – | 9 | 4 | – | – | – | – | – | 27 |
| Nézőpont | 15–17 May 2023 | 1,000 | 51 | 9 | 16 | 2 | 1 | 3 | 5 | – | 6 | 3 | – | – | – | – | 4 | 35 |
| Závecz Research | 28 Apr–5 May 2023 | 1,000 | 46 | 8 | 19 | 6 | 2 | 4 | 6 | – | 7 | 3 | – | – | – | – | – | 27 |
| Nézőpont | 2–4 Jan 2023 | 1,000 | 56 | 6 | 14 | 2 | 1 | 3 | 2 | 6 | – | 4 | – | – | – | – | 6 | 42 |
| 2022 parliamentary election | 3 Apr 2022 | – | 54.1 | 34.4 | | | | | | | 5.9 | 3.3 | 1.0 | – | – | – | 1.3 | 19.7 |
| 2019 election | 26 May 2019 | – | 52.6 | 9.9 | 16.1 | 6.6 | | 2.2 | 6.3 | – | 3.3 | 2.6 | – | – | – | – | 0.4 | 36.5 |

=== Italy ===
Exit poll

| Fieldwork date | Polling firm | Sample size | Lega ID | PD S&D | M5S NI | FI EPP | NM EPP | FdI ECR | AVS Left–G/EFA | PTD (Note: Polls before 12 March 2024 refer to it as People's Union (UP).) Left | SUE | | A Renew | DSP NI | Italexit NI | Libertà NI | Others | Lead |
| Fieldwork date | Polling firm | Sample size | Lega ID | PD S&D | M5S NI | FI EPP | NM EPP | FdI ECR | AVS Left–G/EFA | PTD Left | +E Renew | IV Renew | A Renew | DSP NI | Italexit NI | Libertà NI | Others | Lead |
|---|---|---|---|---|---|---|---|---|---|---|---|---|---|---|---|---|---|---|
| 8–9 Jun 2024 | Consorzio Opinio | – | 8–10 | 21–25 | 10–14 | 8.5–10.5 | | 26–30 | 5–7 | 1–3 | 3.5–5.5 | | 2.5–4.5 | – | – | 0–2 | 0–3 | 9–1 |
| 20–24 May 2024 | SWG | 2,000 | 8.6 | 22.0 | 14.7 | 8.6 | | 27.3 | 4.6 | 2.5 | 4.2 | | 4.0 | | | 2.0 | | 5.3 |
| 25–25 May 2024 | Noto | 1,000 | 9.0 | 20.5 | 15.0 | 9.0 | | 28.0 | 4.0 | 2.2 | 4.0 | | 4.0 | | | 3.0 | | 7.5 |
| 22–23 May 2024 | Demopolis | 2,000 | 8.8 | 22.0 | 14.5 | 8.7 | | 27.0 | 4.3 | 2.2 | 4.2 | | 3.7 | | | 2.8 | | 5.0 |
| 21–22 May 2024 | Eumetra | 800 | 8.7 | 21.1 | 16.2 | 8.9 | | 27.1 | 4.2 | 2.2 | 4.5 | | 3.8 | | | 2.0 | | 6.0 |
| 22–23 May 2024 | Termometro | 3,900 | 9.0 | 19.6 | 15.7 | 8.5 | | 26.8 | 4.0 | 2.5 | 4.5 | | 3.9 | | | 1.8 | 1.0 | 7.2 |
| 19–23 May 2024 | Quorum | 1,604 | 9.0 | 20.3 | 15.9 | 8.5 | | 27.2 | 4.9 | 1.9 | 4.1 | | 3.9 | | | 0.9 | 0.5 | 6.9 |
| 19–23 May 2024 | EMG | 2,000 | 9.3 | 20.9 | 15.7 | 7.9 | | 26.9 | 4.2 | | 4.5 | | 3.7 | | | | | 6.0 |
| 20–21 May 2024 | Ipsos | 1,000 | 8.6 | 22.5 | 15.4 | 9.2 | | 26.5 | 4.6 | 1.9 | 4.1 | | 3.6 | | | 2.0 | 0.7 | 4.0 |
| 19–21 May 2024 | Cluster 17 | 1,051 | 8.7 | 20.8 | 15.5 | 8.2 | | 26.9 | 4.3 | 2.2 | 4.6 | | 3.7 | 1.0 | | 2.2 | 1.9 | 7.1 |
| 20–21 May 2024 | Bidimedia | 1,190 | 9.1 | 21.2 | 15.2 | 8.3 | | 27.1 | 4.4 | 2.0 | 4.6 | | 4.0 | | | 2.5 | 1.6 | 6.0 |
| 17–22 Apr 2024 | SWG | 1,200 | 8.5 | 20.0 | 15.9 | 8.4 | | 26.8 | 4.3 | 2.1 | 4.7 | | 4.1 | 1.4 | | 2.2 | 1.6 | 6.8 |
| 17–19 Apr 2024 | Quorum | 801 | 7.2 | 20.5 | 16.5 | 7.6 | | 27.8 | 4.4 | 1.9 | 5.0 | | 3.3 | | | 1.6 | 4.2 | 7.3 |
| 17–18 Apr 2024 | Demos | 1,005 | 8.5 | 20.2 | 16.4 | 8.0 | | 28.0 | 4.2 | | 4.1 | | 4.0 | | | | 6.6 | 7.8 |
| 16–18 Apr 2024 | Termometro Politico | 4,100 | 8.5 | 19.7 | 16.1 | 8.3 | | 27.5 | 3.2 | 2.5 | 5.2 | | 3.8 | 1.9 | | 1.6 | 1.7 | 7.8 |
| 16–17 Apr 2024 | Eumetra | | 8.5 | 19.7 | 16.4 | 8.3 | | 27.4 | 3.8 | 1.9 | 5.1 | | 3.8 | 1.3 | | 1.9 | 2.0 | 7.7 |
| 10–15 Apr 2024 | SWG | 1,200 | 8.6 | 19.4 | 16.0 | 8.4 | | 27.2 | 4.1 | 1.8 | 5.2 | | 4.2 | 1.4 | | 1.9 | 1.8 | 7.8 |
| 13 Apr 2024 | Tecnè | | 7.9 | 19.8 | 16.2 | 10.1 | | 27.3 | 3.7 | 1.6 | 5.5 | | 3.6 | | | 2.0 | 2.3 | 7.5 |
| 8–12 Apr 2024 | Ixè | 1,000 | 8.0 | 19.9 | 16.4 | 8.4 | | 26.6 | 4.2 | 1.1 | 4.0 | | 3.7 | | | 1.3 | 6.4 | 6.7 |
| 9–11 Apr 2024 | Termometro Politico | 3,700 | 8.8 | 19.5 | 15.6 | 8.0 | | 27.8 | 3.3 | 2.4 | 5.1 | | 3.9 | 1.8 | | 1.8 | 2.4 | 8.3 |
| 8–9 Apr 2024 | Demopolis | 2,000 | 8.0 | 20.0 | 15.8 | 8.7 | | 27.0 | 3.8 | 2.2 | 4.6 | | 3.5 | | | 2.1 | 2.0 | 7.0 |
| 3–8 Apr 2024 | SWG | 1,200 | 8.8 | 19.8 | 15.6 | 7.8 | | 26.9 | 3.9 | 1.6 | 5.3 | | 4.0 | 1.4 | | 1.5 | 3.4 | 7.1 |
| 8 Apr 2024 | Euromedia | 800 | 8.7 | 19.7 | 17.6 | 8.5 | | 26.9 | 3.7 | 1.8 | 4.4 | | 3.8 | | | 3.7 | 1.2 | 7.2 |
| 5 Apr 2024 | EMG | – | 7.8 | 20.2 | 16.7 | 9.0 | 1.0 | 27.2 | 3.3 | 1.2 | 6.2 | | 3.2 | | | | 4.2 | 7.0 |
| 4–5 Apr 2024 | Quorum | 801 | 7.5 | 19.8 | 16.0 | 7.8 | | 27.7 | 3.9 | 2.2 | 4.6 | | 3.1 | | | 1.6 | 4.7 | 7.9 |
| 2–4 Apr 2024 | EMG | 1,000 | 7.8 | 20.2 | 16.7 | 9.0 | | 27.2 | 3.3 | 1.2 | 6.2 | | 3.2 | | | | 5.2 | 7.0 |
| 28–30 Mar 2024 | BiDiMedia | 2,000 | 8.3 | 20.2 | 16.6 | 7.1 | | 27.1 | 4.4 | 1.5 | 5.1 | | 4.4 | 1.3 | | 1.1 | 2.7 | 6.9 |
| 27 Mar 2024 | Euromedia | 800 | 8.8 | 19.3 | 17.5 | 8.0 | 0.7 | 27.5 | 3.5 | 2.0 | 4.7 | | 4.0 | | | 1.7 | 2.3 | 8.2 (Note: Without leaders) |
| 27 Mar 2024 | Euromedia | 800 | 8.7 | 19.5 | 17.5 | 8.3 | 0.6 | 27.9 | 3.0 | 2.0 | 4.8 | | 4.1 | | | 1.7 | 1.9 | 8.5 (Note: With leaders) |
| 19–25 Mar 2024 | Ipsos | 1,000 | 8.0 | 20.5 | 16.1 | 8.7 | 0.7 | 27.5 | 3.3 | 1.5 | 2.8 | 3.3 | 2.5 | 1.2 | 1.5 | | 2.4 | 7.0 |
| 20 Mar 2024 | Ipsos | – | 8.2 | 19.0 | 17.4 | 8.2 | | 27.0 | 4.1 | | 2.6 | 3.4 | 3.0 | | | | 7.1 | 8.0 |
| 19 Mar 2024 | Noto | – | 8.0 | 19.0 | 17.0 | 8.0 | 2.0 | 28.0 | 3.5 | | 2.5 | 3.0 | 3.5 | | | | 5.5 | 9.0 |
| 19 Mar 2024 | Noto | – | 7.0 | 20.0 | 16.0 | 8.0 | 2.0 | 30.0 | 3.0 | | 2.5 | 3.0 | 3.5 | | | | 5.0 | 10.0 |
| 11 Mar 2024 | Euromedia | 800 | 8.7 | 19.7 | 17.2 | 7.7 | 0.7 | 28.0 | 3.9 | | 2.7 | 3.5 | 4.0 | | | | 4.0 | 8.3 |
| 11 Mar 2024 | Euromedia | 800 | 8.6 | 20.2 | 16.9 | 8.2 | 0.4 | 28.7 | 3.4 | | 1.5 | | | 3.8 | 4.0 | | 3.3 | 8.5 |
| 7 Mar 2024 | Noto | – | 8.0 | 19.5 | 16.5 | 7.5 | 2.0 | 27.0 | 4.0 | | 3.5 | 3.0 | 3.5 | | | | 5.5 | 7.5 |
| 7 Mar 2024 | Noto | – | 7.5 | 20.5 | 16.5 | 8.0 | 1.5 | 29.0 | 3.5 | | 3.5 | 3.0 | 3.0 | | | | 4.0 | 8.5 |
| 23 Feb – 5 Mar 2024 | Ipsos | 1,503 | 8.2 | 19.0 | 17.4 | 8.2 | | 27.0 | 4.1 | | 2.6 | 3.4 | 3.0 | | | | 7.1 | 8.0 |
| 28 Feb – 1 Mar 2024 | Quorum | 803 | 8.1 | 19.9 | 15.9 | 6.6 | 0.7 | 27.1 | 4.6 | | 3.4 | 3.5 | 3.7 | | 1.6 | | 4.9 | 7.2 |
| 28 Feb 2024 | Euromedia | 800 | 8.6 | 19.6 | 17.0 | 7.9 | 1.4 | 27.6 | 4.0 | | 2.6 | 3.1 | 4.3 | | | | 3.9 | 8.0 |
| 28 Feb 2024 | Euromedia | 800 | 8.7 | 20.0 | 17.2 | 8.5 | 1.2 | 28.1 | 3.9 | | 2.5 | | | 3.5 | 4.0 | | 2.4 | 8.1 |
| 26–28 Feb 2024 | Bidimedia | 1,000 | 8.5 | 20.0 | 15.5 | 7.5 | 0.8 | 28.1 | 3.9 | 1.5 | 2.4 | 3.0 | 4.3 | 1.2 | 1.3 | | 2.0 | 8.1 |
| 25–28 Feb 2024 | Cluster17 | 1,022 | 9.1 | 19.7 | 16.0 | 7.6 | 0.4 | 27.3 | 4.6 | 0.7 | 2.1 | 3.0 | 4.0 | 1.6 | 1.9 | | 2.1 | 7.6 |
| 20–22 Feb 2024 | Ipsos | 1,000 | 8.3 | 18.3 | 17.0 | 7.9 | 1.1 | 28.2 | 3.5 | 1.8 | 2.2 | 3.6 | 3.3 | 1.0 | 2.0 | | 1.8 | 9.9 |
| 17–22 Feb 2024 | Stack Data Strategy | 944 | 8.7 | 19.9 | 15.5 | 6.6 | 0.9 | 27.1 | 3.7 | 1.4 | 4.2 | 4.9 | 3.3 | | 1.7 | | 2.1 | 7.3 |
| 21 Feb 2024 | Noto | – | 8.0 | 19.5 | 18.0 | 7.0 | 2.0 | 27.5 | 3.5 | | 3.5 | 3.0 | 3.5 | | | | 4.5 | 8.0 |
| 30 Jan – 1 Feb 2024 | Termometro Politico | 3,800 | 9.4 | 19.6 | 16.2 | 6.8 | | 29.1 | 3.0 | 1.5 | 2.4 | 2.6 | 3.8 | 1.7 | 1.4 | | 2.5 | 9.5 |
| 30–31 Jan 2024 | Demopolis | – | 9.0 | 20.0 | 15.8 | 7.2 | | 28.0 | 3.6 | | 2.0 | 2.7 | 3.8 | | | | 8.1 | 8.0 |
| 24–31 Jan 2024 | Portland | 502 | 7.0 | 21.0 | 16.0 | 10.0 | | 28.0 | 3.0 | 2.0 | 3.0 | 5.0 | 2.0 | | 1.0 | | 2.0 (Note: SVP 0.0%) | 7.0 |
| 24–27 Jan 2024 | BiDiMedia | 1,000 | 9.0 | 19.3 | 16.1 | 6.6 | 1.0 | 28.6 | 3.8 | 1.3 | 2.5 | 3.1 | 4.2 | 1.3 | 1.2 | | 2.0 | 9.3 |
| 25–26 Jan 2024 | Quorum | 803 | 9.3 | 19.2 | 13.6 | 6.5 | 1.6 | 28.4 | 4.3 | | 2.6 | 2.9 | 3.7 | | 1.5 | | 6.4 | 9.2 |
| 22–24 Jan 2024 | Winpoll | 1,000 | 9.1 | 21.5 | 14.6 | 7.8 | | 27.8 | 3.0 | 1.5 | 2.4 | 2.5 | 3.2 | | 1.3 | | 5.3 (Note: PSI 0.8%) | 6.3 |
| 12–22 Jan 2024 | Euromedia | 800 | 8.4 | 19.5 | 17.8 | 7.5 | 0.3 | 28.5 | 3.4 | | 2.5 | 2.8 | 4.3 | | 1.4 | | 3.6 | 9.0 |
| 12–22 Jan 2024 | Euromedia | 800 | 8.2 | 19.0 | 18.1 | 7.2 | 0.3 | 29.3 | 3.3 | | 2.4 | 3.3 | 4.6 | | 1.4 | | 2.9 | 9.3 |
| 16 Jan 2024 | Noto | – | 8.0 | 19.5 | 17.0 | 7.0 | 2.0 | 28.0 | 3.5 | | 2.0 | 3.0 | 3.0 | | | | 7.0 | 8.5 (Note: With party symbols) |
| 16 Jan 2024 | Noto | – | 6.5 | 20.0 | 17.0 | 6.5 | 1.5 | 32.0 | 4.0 | | 2.0 | 3.0 | 3.0 | | | | 4.5 | 12.0 |
| 15–16 Jan 2024 | Tecnè | 800 | 8.4 | 19.8 | 15.6 | 9.2 | | 29.0 | | | | 2.9 | 3.9 | | | | 11.2 | 9.2 |
| 15–16 Jan 2024 | Tecnè | 800 | 8.3 | 19.5 | 15.6 | 9.3 | | 29.3 | | | | 2.9 | 3.9 | | | | 11.0 | 9.8 |
| 4 Jan 2024 | IZI | 1,068 | 9.3 | 19.5 | 17.0 | 7.4 | | 27.1 | 4.2 | | 3.0 | 3.0 | 3.5 | | | | 6.0 | 7.6 |
| 30 Dec – 4 Jan 2024 | Lab2101 | 1,000 | 10.2 | 19.8 | 16.2 | 5.8 | 0.7 | 29.4 | 4.0 | | 2.3 | 2.8 | 3.9 | | 2.3 | | 2.6 | 9.6 |
| 26 May 2019 | 2019 European election | – | 34.3 | 22.7 | 17.1 | 8.8 | | 6.4 | 4.1 (Note: Combined results for Green Europe (EV) and The Left (LS) lists at the election) | | 3.1 | – | – | 0.9 | – | – | 4.5 | 7.6 |

=== Ireland ===
==== National polls ====
| Last date of polling | Polling firm / Commissioner | Sample size | SF Left | FF Renew | FG EPP | GP G/EFA | Lab S&D | SD | PBP–S | Aon | II | O/I (Note: The figure for 'Others/Independents' (including Independents 4 Change candidates) is the remainder when all others are removed. As with all such calculations, the figure shown may be slightly inaccurate due to rounding effects.) |
|---|---|---|---|---|---|---|---|---|---|---|---|---|
| 27 May 2024 | Ireland Thinks/The Journal | 1,161 | 17.4 | 17.7 | 18 | 7.2 | 3.5 | 5.3 | 2.8 | 5 (Note: Includes 'Others'.) | – (Note: Not specifically mentioned in the report.) | 23 |
| 22 May 2024 | Red C/Business Post | 1,021 | 21 | 14 | 20 | 5 | 3 | 5 | 4 | 3 | – | 25 (Note: Includes 21% for 'Independent' and 4% for 'Other Party'.) |
| 15 May 2024 | Ipsos B&A/Irish Times | 1,500 | 16 | 22 | 19 | 4 | 6 | 3 | 3 | 2 | 4 | 21 |
| 7 May 2024 | Ireland Thinks/The Journal | 1,633 | 22 | 16 | 19 | 6 | 3 | 5 | 2 | 4 | – | 24 |
| 7 April 2024 | Ireland Thinks/The Journal | 1,334 | 23 | 17 | 20 | 6 | 3 | 6 | 3 | 5 | – | 17 |
| 7 February 2024 | Ireland Thinks/The Journal | 1,255 | 26 | 19 | 19 | 6 | 4 | 4 | 3 | – | – | 19 |
| 8 February 2020 | 2020 general election | — | 24.5 | 22.2 | 20.9 | 7.1 | 4.4 | 2.9 | 2.6 | 1.9 | – (Note: Did not contest this election.) | 13.5 |
| 24 May 2019 | 2019 EP election | — | 11.7 | 16.6 | 29.6 | 11.4 | 3.1 | 1.2 | 2.3 | – | – | 24.1 |

==== Dublin ====
| Last date of polling | Polling firm / Commissioner | Sample size | Andrews (FF) | L. Boylan (SF) | Doherty (FG) | Ó Riordáin (Lab) | Cuffe (GP) | Smith (S–PBP) | Daly (I4C) | Gibney (SD) | N. Boylan (II) | Doolan (SF) | Considine (Aon) | Others |
|---|---|---|---|---|---|---|---|---|---|---|---|---|---|---|
| 31 May 2024 | Ireland Thinks/Sunday Independent | 496 | 14.1 | 11.2 | 15 | 7.4 | 7.4 | 4.8 | 8.3 | 4.6 | 9.2 | 3.4 | 2.1 | 12.5 |
| 15 May 2024 | Ipsos B&A/The Irish Times | 500 | 18 | 15 | 12 | 10 | 8 | 6 | 6 | 5 | 5 | 3 | 2 | 14 |
| 7 May 2024 | Ireland Thinks/Sunday Independent | 457 | 17 | 16 | 14 | 7 | 8 | 6 | 5 | 4 | 7 | 3 | 2 | 11 |

==== Midlands–North-West ====
| Last date of polling | Polling firm / Commissioner | Sample size | Flanagan (Ind) | Walsh (FG) | Cowen (FF) | Chambers (FF) | Carberry (FG) | Gildernew (SF) | Mullooly (II) | MacManus (SF) | Blaney (FF) | Casey (Ind) | Tóibín (Aon) | Others |
|---|---|---|---|---|---|---|---|---|---|---|---|---|---|---|
| 31 May 2024 | Ireland Thinks/Sunday Independent | 614 | 12.1 | 12.5 | 10.5 | 5.3 | 7 | 7.2 | 6.4 | 5.6 | 2.6 | 2.9 | 7.5 | 20.5 |
| 15 May 2024 | Ipsos B&A/The Irish Times | 500 | 11 | 10 | 10 | 9 | 9 | 8 | 7 | 6 | 4 | 4 | 4 | 17 |
| 7 May 2024 | Ireland Thinks/Sunday Independent | 631 | 10 | 9 | 10 | 6 | 9 | 8 | 8 | 7 | 2 | 4 | 6 | 21 |

==== South ====
| Last date of polling | Polling firm / Commissioner | Sample size | Kelly (FG) | Kelleher (FF) | Funchion (SF) | Ní Mhurchú (FF) | Gavan (SF) | Hourigan (Lab) | McNamara (Ind) | Mullins (FG) | Blighe (IF) | O'Sullivan (GP) | Wallace (I4C) | Doyle (SD) | Others |
|---|---|---|---|---|---|---|---|---|---|---|---|---|---|---|---|
| 31 May 2024 | Ireland Thinks/Sunday Independent | 660 | 18.5 | 14.4 | 9.5 | 4.6 | 5.7 | 3.6 | 9.9 | 4.2 | 4.3 | 6.2 | 4.7 | 3.3 | 10.5 |
| 15 May 2024 | Ipsos B&A/The Irish Times | 500 | 23 | 18 | 11 | 7 | 6 | 5 | 4 | 4 | 4 | 3 | 3 | 2 | 10 |
| 7 May 2024 | Ireland Thinks/Sunday Independent | 643 | 14 | 16 | 13 | 4 | 5 | 3 | 8 | 6 | 4 | 5 | 5 | 5 | 12 |

=== Latvia ===
| Polling firm | Fieldwork date | Sample size | JV EPP | S S&D | NA ECR | LA Renew | Par! Renew | ZZS | AS | JKP | PRO G/EFA | TZV | CP | TVS | S! | LPV | SV | AJ | Lead |
|---|---|---|---|---|---|---|---|---|---|---|---|---|---|---|---|---|---|---|---|
| SKDS/LTV | March 2024 | 1.505 | 16.6 (1) | 10.1 (1) | 17.1 (2) | 8.9 (1) | 1.5 | 3.4 | 6.1 (1) | 3.5 | 9.6 (1) | 0.2 | 2.1 | 0.6 | 6.4 (1) | 8.2 (1) | 3.8 | 1.9 | 0.5 |
| SKDS/LTV | 10-14 February 2024 | 1,505 | 17.9 (2) | 9.1 (1) | 16.5 (1) | 9.2 (1) | 0.6 | 4.0 | 7.4 (1) | 3.5 | 8.9 (1) | 0.8 | 2.1 | 0.5 | 7.5 (1) | 6.6 (1) | 3.2 | 2.3 | 1.4 |
| 2019 election | 25 May 2019 | – | 26.4 (2) | 17.6 (2) | 16.5 (2) | 12.5 (1) | | 5.6 (0) | 5.0 | 4.4 | 2.9 | 0.9 | 6.8 (1) (Note: Latvian Russian Union: 6.3% (1); Centre Party: 0.5%) | 0.2 | | | | | 8.7 |

=== Lithuania ===
| Pollster | Fieldwork dates | Sample size | TS–LKD EPP | LVŽS G/EFA | DP NI | LSDP S&D | LP Renew | LRLS Renew | LRP | PLT | DSVL G/EFA | Others (Note: Parties which received less than 1% of the vote.) | Lead |
|---|---|---|---|---|---|---|---|---|---|---|---|---|---|
| Baltijos tyrimai | 10-21 April 2024 | 1,020 | 14.3; 2 | 11.6; 1 | 8.9; 1 | 27.1; 3 | 4.1; 0 | 6.6; 1 | 5.1; 1 | 2.7; 0 | 13.3; 2 | 6.5 (Note: Coalition of Peace 1.5%, Lithuanian Green Party 1.4%, National Alliance 1.4%, People and Justice Union 0.9%, Electoral Action of Poles in Lithuania 0.7%, Christian Union 0.2%, Lithuanian People's Party 0.2%, Lithuanian List 0.2%); 0 | 12.8 |
| 2020 Lithuanian parliamentary election | | 1,133,561 | 25.77 (4) | 18.07 (3) | 9.77 (1) | 9.58 (1) | 9.45 (1) | 7.04 (1) | 3.28 (0) | 2.06 (0) | – | 9.22 (0) | 7.70 |
| 2019 European Parliament election | | 1,259,954 | 19.74 3 | 12.56 2 | 8.99 1 | 15.88 2 | – | 6.59 1 | 2.36 0 | 1.92 0 | – | 31.96 2 | 3.86 |

=== Luxembourg ===
No opinion polls are expected to be done for the European Parliament election in Luxembourg. The results of recent elections are shown in the absence of that.

| Polling execution | | | Parties | | | | | | | | | | | |
| Polling firm | Fieldwork date | Sample size | DP Renew | CSV EPP | Greens G/EFA | LSAP S&D | ADR ECR | Pirate G/EFA | Lénk Left | Volt G/EFA | KPL | DK | Fokus | Others |
|---|---|---|---|---|---|---|---|---|---|---|---|---|---|---|
| 2023 general election | | | 19.1 (2) | 29.3 (3) | 8.3 (0) | 18.2 (1) | 9.6 (0) | 6.7 (0) | 3.6 (0) | 0.2 (0) | 0.5 (0) | 1.4 (0) | 2.6 (0) | — |
| 2023 municipal elections | | | 19.8 (1) | 26.5 (2) | 11.6 (1) | 21.9 (2) | 20.3 (0) | | | | | | | |
| 2019 EP election | | | 21.4 (2) | 21.1 (2) | 18.9 (1) | 12.2 (1) | 10.0 (0) | 7.7 (0) | 4.8 (0) | 2.1 (0) | 1.1 (0) | 0.5 (0) | — | |

=== Malta ===
It is not uncommon for smaller parties to be grouped together or excluded in polls by Maltese media houses.

| | Polling firm | Sample size | | Partit Nazzjonalista | Imperium Europa | ADPD | ABBA | | IND/ Others | Lead | Not voting (Note: Excluded from calculation for the party percentages.) | Don't know/ Invalid |
|---|---|---|---|---|---|---|---|---|---|---|---|---|
| 30 May–4 June 2024 | L-Orizzont (Note: Sister newspaper of 'It-Torċa', a GWU-owned newspaper, closely aligned to the Labour Party.) | 1,800 | 50.9 | 40.1 | 3.5 | 5.5 | | | | 10.8 | 31 | 33 Invalid |
| 22 May–4 June 2024 | MaltaToday (Note: Survey was candidate based, thus the quantity in 'Other' will definitely include parties listed here and might overflow 100%. Percentages brought about by combining candidate first-preference vote shares. Thus the lead percentage and winning party may not be realistic.) | 1,007 | 43.3 | 48.1 | 1.9 | 0.6 | - | - | 6.2 | 4.8 | – | |
| 3–10 May 2024 | MaltaToday | 657 | 49.4 | 41.7 | 8.9 | | | | | 7.7 | 30.6 | – |
| 6–10 May 2024 | It-Torċa (Note: Sister newspaper of 'L-Orizzont', a GWU-owned newspaper, closely aligned to the Labour Party.) | 1,000 | 51.5 | 40.3 | 5.1 | 4.1 | | | | 11.2 | 31 | – |
| 15–24 April 2024 | MaltaToday | 656 | 50.7 | 44.2 | 5.1 | | | | | 6.5 | 29 | – |
| 1–13 April 2024 | Esprimi | 600 | 45.4 | 38.0 | 3.2 | 13.4 | | | | 7.4 | – | 41.0 |
| 7 March - 21 March 2024 | MaltaToday | 657 | 52.8 | 42.6 | 4.6 | | | | | 10.2 | 23.4 | – |
| 27 Feb – 12 Mar 2024 | Esprimi/Times of Malta | 600 | 52.4 | 39.3 | 8.3 | | | | | 13.1 | 33 | – |
| 26 Jan–05 Feb 2024 | MaltaToday | 647 | 47.9 | 41.0 | 11.1 | | | | | 6.9 | 37.5 | – |
| 26 Mar 2022 | 2022 Maltese general election | – | 55.1 | 41.7 | n/a | 1.6 | 0.5 | 0.1 | 0.4 | 13.4 | 24.4 | 2.9 |
| 25 May 2019 | 2019 European Parliament election in Malta | – | 54.3 | 37.9 | 3.17 | 2.7 (Note: Combined result of Democratic Alternative and Democratic Party vote shares before party merger) | 0.5 (Note: As Alliance for Change) | n/a | 1.2 | 16.4 | 27.3 | 2.6 |

=== Netherlands ===
Exit poll

| Polling firm | Fieldwork date | Sample size | Total | GL–PvdA | | VVD Renew | CDA EPP | FvD NI | D66 Renew | SGP ECR | CU EPP | PvdD Left | 50PLUS Renew | PVV ID | SP Left | Volt G/EFA | BBB EPP | NSC EPP | Lead | Ref |
| Polling firm | Fieldwork date | Sample size | Total | PvdA S&D | GL G/EFA | VVD Renew | CDA EPP | FvD NI | D66 Renew | SGP ECR | CU EPP | PvdD Left | 50PLUS Renew | PVV ID | SP Left | Volt G/EFA | BBB EPP | NSC EPP | Lead | Ref |
|---|---|---|---|---|---|---|---|---|---|---|---|---|---|---|---|---|---|---|---|---|
| Ipsos | 6 Jun 2024 | – | 31 | 8 | | 4 | 3 | 0 | 3 | 1 | 0 | 1 | 0 | 7 | 0 | 1 | 2 | 1 | 1 | |
| Peil.nl | 5 Jun 2024 | – | 31 | 8 | | 4 | 2 | 1 | 2 | 1 | 0 | 1 | 0 | 8 | 0 | 2 | 1 | 1 | Tie | |
| Ipsos | 3–5 Jun 2024 | 2,030 | 31 | 8 | | 5 | 2 | 0 | 2 | 0 | 0 | 1 | 0 | 8 | 1 | 1 | 1 | 2 | Tie | |
| Ipsos | 24–27 May 2024 | 2,048 | 31 | 8 | | 5 | 2 | 0 | 2 | 0 | 0 | 0 | 0 | 9 | 1 | 2 | 1 | 1 | 1 | |
| I&O Research | 17–21 May 2024 | 2,141 | 31 | 7 | | 4 | 2 | 0 | 2 | 1 | 0 | 1 | 0 | 9 | 1 | 2 | 1 | 1 | 2 | |
| Peil.nl | 17–18 May 2024 | – | 31 | 8 | | 5 | 2 | 1 | 2 | 0 | 0 | 1 | 0 | 8 | 1 | 1 | 1 | 1 | Tie | |
| I&O Research | 10–14 May 2024 | 2,102 | 31 | 8 | | 4 | 2 | 1 | 2 | 1 | 1 | 0 | 0 | 8 | 1 | 2 | 0 | 1 | Tie | |
| Peil.nl | 3–4 May 2024 | – | 31 | 8 | | 5 | 2 | 1 | 2 | 0 | 0 | 1 | 0 | 8 | 1 | 1 | 1 | 1 | Tie | |
| I&O Research | 12–15 Apr 2024 | 2,182 | 31 | 7 | | 5 | 2 | 0 | 3 | 1 | 0 | 1 | 0 | 8 | 1 | 1 | 1 | 1 | 1 | |
| I&O Research | 22–25 Mar 2024 | 1,586 | 31 | 7 | | 5 | 2 | 0 | 2 | 1 | 0 | 1 | 0 | 10 | 0 | 2 | 1 | 0 | 3 | |
| Ipsos | 23 Feb – 5 Mar 2024 | 1,890 | 31 | 6 | | 5 | 2 | 0 | 2 | 0 | 0 | 1 | 0 | 9 | 1 | 2 | 1 | 2 | 3 | |
| 2019 election | 23 May 2019 | – | 29 | 6 | 3 | 5 | 4 | 4 | 2 | 2 | | 1 | 1 | 1 | 0 | 0 | – | – | 1 | |

Exit poll

| Polling firm | Fieldwork date | Sample size | GL–PvdA | | VVD Renew | CDA EPP | FvD NI | D66 Renew | SGP ECR | CU EPP | PvdD Left | 50PLUS Renew | PVV ID | SP Left | Volt G/EFA | JA21 ECR | BBB EPP | NSC EPP | Others | Lead | Ref |
| Polling firm | Fieldwork date | Sample size | PvdA S&D | GL G/EFA | VVD Renew | CDA EPP | FvD NI | D66 Renew | SGP ECR | CU EPP | PvdD Left | 50PLUS Renew | PVV ID | SP Left | Volt G/EFA | JA21 ECR | BBB EPP | NSC EPP | Others | Lead | Ref |
|---|---|---|---|---|---|---|---|---|---|---|---|---|---|---|---|---|---|---|---|---|---|
| Ipsos | 6 Jun 2024 | – | 21.6% | | 11.6% | 9.7% | 2.5% | 8.1% | 3.4% | 2.7% | 4.4% | 0.8% | 17.7% | 2.0% | 4.9% | – | 5.3% | 3.8% | 1.7% | 3.9% | |
| Ipsos | 3–5 Jun 2024 | 2,030 | 19.5% | | 13.8% | 6.1% | 2.7% | 7.1% | 2.4% | 2.7% | 3.6% | 0.6% | 21.3% | 3.6% | 4.4% | – | 4.0% | 5.0% | 3.3% | 1.8% | |
| Ipsos | 24–27 May 2024 | 2,048 | 20.3% | | 12.5% | 5.3% | 3.2% | 6.4% | 2.3% | 3.0% | 3.1% | 0.6% | 22.7% | 3.2% | 6.3% | – | 3.9% | 4.7% | 2.5% | 2.4% | |
| I&O Research | 17–21 May 2024 | 2,141 | 19.3% | | 10.9% | 5.7% | 2.9% | 7.1% | 3.8% | 3.0% | 4.5% | – | 23.0% | 3.3% | 5.9% | 1.4% | 4.4% | 3.5% | 1.4% | 3.7% | |
| I&O Research | 10–14 May 2024 | 2,102 | 21.3% | | 11.8% | 5.8% | 3.6% | 6.8% | 3.8% | 3.3% | 3.2% | – | 22.5% | 3.4% | 5.4% | 0.8% | 3.2% | 3.5% | 1.8% | 1.2% | |
| I&O Research | 12–15 Apr 2024 | 2,182 | 18.7% | | 12.6% | 5.4% | 3.1% | 7.8% | 3.3% | 3.0% | 4.6% | – | 22.0% | 3.6% | 4.7% | 1.1% | 4.3% | 4.2% | 1.6% | 3.3% | |
| I&O Research | 22–25 Mar 2024 | 1,586 | 18.6% | | 14.1% | 5.5% | 3.0% | 7.0% | 3.8% | 3.1% | 4.0% | – | 25.1% | 2.9% | 5.2% | 1.0% | 3.9% | 3.1% | – | 6.5% | |
| Ipsos | 23 Feb – 5 Mar 2024 | 1,890 | 16.0% | | 12.7% | 5.6% | 2.3% | 6.0% | 2.6% | 2.4% | 3.7% | – | 22.4% | 3.2% | 4.9% | – | 4.5% | 4.7% | 8.8% | 6.4% | |
| Portland | 24–31 Jan 2024 | 535 | 17% | | 12% | 5% | 2% | 5% | 3% | 1% | 3% | 1% | 25% | 3% | 3% | 2% | 4% | 12% | 2% | 8% | |
| 2019 election | 23 May 2019 | – | 19.0% | 10.9% | 14.6% | 12.2% | 11.0% | 7.1% | 6.8% | | 4.0% | 3.9% | 3.5% | 3.4% | 1.9% | – | – | – | 1.6% | 4.4% | |

=== Poland ===
Graphical summary of opinion polls: Civic Platform Law and Justice Konfederacja Third Way Lewica

| Polling firm/Link | Fieldwork date | Sample size | United Right ECR | | Third Way EPP–Ren. | Civic Coalition EPP–G/EFA–Ren. | The Left S&D | | | Confederation NI | There is One Poland NI | Bezpartyjni Samorządowcy NI | PolExit NI | Others | Don't know | Lead |
| Polling firm/Link | Fieldwork date | Sample size | Law and Justice | Kukiz'15 | Third Way EPP–Ren. | Civic Coalition EPP–G/EFA–Ren. | New Left | | Left Together | Confederation NI | There is One Poland NI | Bezpartyjni Samorządowcy NI | PolExit NI | Others | Don't know | Lead |
| Polling firm/Link | Fieldwork date | Sample size | Law and Justice | Kukiz'15 | Third Way EPP–Ren. | Civic Coalition EPP–G/EFA–Ren. | SLD | Spring | Left Together | Confederation NI | There is One Poland NI | Bezpartyjni Samorządowcy NI | PolExit NI | Others | Don't know | Lead |
|---|---|---|---|---|---|---|---|---|---|---|---|---|---|---|---|---|
| IPSOS (Late Poll) | 10 June | | 35.7; 20 | | 7.3; 4 | 37.4; 20 | 6.6; 3 | | | 11.8; 6 | | 0.8; 0 | 0.3; 0 | 0.1; 0 | | 1.7 |
| IPSOS | 9 June | | 33.9; 19 | | 8.2; 4 | 38.2; 21 | 6.6; 3 | | | 11.9; 6 | | 0.8; 0 | 0.3; 0 | 0.1; 0 | | 4.3 |
| Pollster / Republika | 6–7 Jun 2024 | 1,083 | 33 | | 11 | 34 | 9 | | | 12 | | | | 1 | | 1 |
| OGB | 4–7 Jun 2024 | 800 | 36.04; 18 | | 7.54; 5 | 37.45; 20 | 5.01; 4 | | | 11.49; 6 | | 0.59; 0 | 0.15; 0 | 1.73; 0 | | 1.41 |
| IBRiS / "Wydarzenia" Polsat | 6 Jun 2024 | – | 30.5 | | 9.6 | 31.5 | 8.1 | | | 9.7 | | 0.6 | 0.1 | | 10.0 | 1.0 |
| Pollster / "SE.pl" | 5–6 Jun 2024 | 1,031 | 31.63 | | 11.65 | 34.86 | 8.94 | | | 10.72 | | | | 2.20 | | 3.23 |
| IPSOS / OKO.press, TOK FM | 4–6 Jun 2024 | 1,000 | 29 | | 10 | 33 | 7 | | | 11 | | 2 | 1 | | 7 | 4 |
| ewybory.eu | 17 May–6 Jun 2024 | 5,709 | 33.7 | | 10.9 | 33.3 | 9.6 | | | 10.2 | | 1.7 | 0.5 | 0.1 | | 0.4 |
| Opinia24 / Gazeta Wyborcza | 4–5 Jun 2024 | 1,001 | 29.8; 19 | | 8.9; 5 | 32.1; 20 | 7.7; 4 | | | 9; 5 | | | | 3.6; 0 | 8.9 | 2.3 |
| Opinia24 / TVN | 4–5 Jun 2024 | 1,000 | 32 | | 9 | 34 | 8 | | | 10 | | 2 | 1 | 1 | 3 | 2 |
| CBOS | 20 May–5 Jun 2024 | 1,038 | 28.9 | | 11.4 | 33.4 | 9.7 | | | 10.5 | | 0.5 | | 0.4 | 5.3 | 4.5 |
| IPSOS / TVP | 3–4 June 2024 | – | 29.2; 16 | | 10.9; 6 | 34.5; 20 | 8.0; 4 | | | 13.6; 7 | | 2.6; 0 | 0.6; 0 | | | 5.3 |
| IBRiS / Onet | 3 Jun 2024 | 1,067 | 31.3; 18 | | 11.6; 7 | 33.1; 19 | 8.2; 4 | | | 9.0; 5 | | | | 0.2; 0 | 6.6 | 1.8 |
| IBRiS / "Wydarzenia" Polsat | 3 Jun 2024 (Note: Publication date) | – | 30.1 | | 10.7 | 29.5 | 8.0 | | | 9.5 | | 2.0 | 0.1 | | 10.0 | 0.6 |
| Research Partner | 31 May–3 Jun 2024 | 1,073 | 32.1; 20 | | 9.0; 5 | 31.5; 19 | 6.5; 4 | | | 9.4; 5 | | 2.9; 0 | | 0.1; 0 | 8.5 | 0.6 |
| CBOS | 20 May–2 Jun 2024 | 1,038 | 29 | | 12 | 27 | 7 | | | 10 | | 2 | | 1 | 11 | 2 |
| United Surveys / WP.pl | 24–26 May 2024 | 1,000 | 30.8 | | 10.8 | 32.4 | 7.8 | | | 11.7 | | 0.3 | 0.2 | 0.1 | 5.9 | 1.6 |
| IPSOS / TVP | 22–25 May 2024 | 1,000 | 30 | | 9 | 29 | 8 | | | 13 | | 1 | 0 | 1 | 9 | 1 |
| IBRiS / "Wydarzenia" Polsat | 20 May 2024 (Note: Publication date) | – | 30.0 | | 10.1 | 30.8 | 8.1 | | | 8.8 | | 2.1 | 0.0 | | 10.1 | 0.8 |
| Opinia24 | 13–14 May 2024 | 1,000 | 29 | | 8 | 31 | 6 | | | 10 | | 2 | | | 13 | 2 |
| United Surveys / DGP, RMF | 10–12 May 2024 | 1,000 | 32.7; 19 | | 12.6; 7 | 30.3; 17 | 9.6; 5 | | | 8.6; 5 | | 0.9; 0 | 0.0; 0 | 0.2; 0 | 5.1 | 2.4 |
| IPSOS / OKO.press, TOK FM | 26 Apr–9 May 2024 | 1,096 | 27 | | 9 | 28 | 8 | | | 10 | | 2 | | 1 | 12 | 1 |
| IBRiS / "Wydarzenia" Polsat | 7–8 May 2024 | 1,000 | 29.3 | | 12.1 | 28.3 | 9.7 | | | 9.9 | | | | 1.5 | 9.2 | 1.0 |
| Opinia24 / TOK FM | 6–8 May 2024 | 1,001 | 30.6 | | 7.7 | 30.8 | 9.0 | | | 8.3 | | 2.7 | | | 10.9 | 0.2 |
| | 29 Apr 2024 | Confederation announces There is One Poland candidates on their lists. | | | | | | | | | | | | | | |
| OGB | 22–25 Apr 2024 | 804 | 32.66; 18 | | 13.81; 7 | 33.21; 18 | 5.57; 3 | | | 12.30; 7 | | | | 2.45; 0 | | 0.55 |
| Ipsos / Euronews | 23 Feb–5 Mar 2024 | 1,000 | 29.2 | | 16.5 | 31.3 | 8.4 | | | 13.9 | | | | | | 2.1 |
| Opinia24 / TOK FM | 26–28 Feb 2024 | 1,002 | 22 | | 11 | 31 | 11 | | | 10 | | | | 3 (Note: KORWiN – 1) | 11 | 9 |
| Opinia24 / More In Common Polska | 2–13 Feb 2024 | 2,027 | 29.0 | | 14.0 | 33.5 | 8.5 | | | 7.5 | | | | 1.3 | 6.2 | 4.5 |
| Portland Communications | 24–31 Jan 2024 | 632 | 29 | | 16 | 35 | 9 | | | 8 | | | | 3 | | 6 |
| Parliamentary election | 15 Oct 2023 | 21,596,674 (Note: Turnout: 74,38%) | 35.38 | | 14.40 | 30.70 | 8.61 | | | 7.16 | 1.63 | 1.86 | – | 0.28 | | 4.68 |
| Parliamentary election | 13 Oct 2019 | 18,678,457 (Note: Turnout: 61,74%) | 43.59 | 8.55 | | 27.40 | 12.56 | | | 6.81 | – | 0.78 | – | 0.31 | | 16.19 |
| European election | 26 May 2019 | 13,647,311 (Note: Turnout: 45,69%) | 45.38; 27 | 3.69; 0 | 38.47; 22 | | | 6.06; 3 | 1.24; 0 | 4.55; 0 | – | – | 0.06 | 0.54 | | 6.91 |

=== Portugal ===
Exit poll

| Polling firm/Link | Fieldwork date | Sample size | Turnout | PS | Democratic Alliance (Portugal, 2024) | | | CH | BE | CDU | PAN | L | IL | O | Lead |
| Polling firm/Link | Fieldwork date | Sample size | Turnout | PS | PSD | CDS–PP | PPM | CH | BE | CDU | PAN | L | IL | O | Lead |
| Polling firm/Link | Fieldwork date | Sample size | Turnout | S&D | EPP | EPP | NI | PfE | Left | Left | G/EFA | G/EFA | Renew | O | Lead |
|---|---|---|---|---|---|---|---|---|---|---|---|---|---|---|---|
| 2024 EP election | 9 Jun 2024 | — | 36.6 | 32.1; 8 | 31.1; 7 | | | 9.8; 2 | 4.3; 1 | 4.1; 1 | 1.2; 0 | 3.8; 0 | 9.1; 2 | 4.5; 0 | 1.0 |
| CESOP–UCP | 9 Jun 2024 | 14,185 | 37–40 | 28–34; 6/8 | 28–33; 6/8 | | | 8–12; 2/3 | 3–5; 0/1 | 3–5; 0/1 | 1–2; 0 | 3–5; 0/1 | 8–12; 2/3 | — | 0.5 |
| ICS/ISCTE–GfK/Metris | 9 Jun 2024 | 15,839 | 36.7 | 29.2–33.6; 7/8 | 28.4–32.8; 7/8 | | | 7.5–10.9; 2/3 | 2.8–5.8; 0/1 | 2.8–5.8; 0/1 | 0.4–2.0; 0 | 2.9–5.9; 0/1 | 8.1–11.5; 2/3 | 3.3–6.3; 0 | 0.8 |
| Pitagórica | 9 Jun 2024 | 24,619 | 35.5–41.5 | 27.7–33.7; 6/8 | 26.0–32.0; 6/8 | | | 6.6–12.6; 2/3 | 3.0–7.0; 0/1 | 2.0–6.0; 0/1 | 0.7–2.7; 0 | 2.5–6.5; 0/1 | 8.3–12.3; 2/3 | — | 1.7 |
| Intercampus | 9 Jun 2024 | 19,502 | 38–42 | 27.2–33.2; 6/8 | 26.9–32.9; 6/8 | | | 7.5–11.5; 2/3 | 3.1–6.1; 0/1 | 2.3–5.3; 0/1 | 0.3–2.3; 0 | 3.0–6.0; 0/1 | 8.3–12.3; 2/3 | 2.8–8.8; 0 | 0.3 |
| Intercampus (Note: Results presented here exclude undecideds (12.5%). With their inclusion results are: AD: 24.8%; AD: 24.1%; CHEGA: 12.0%; IL: 9.1%; BE: 5.8%; Livre: 4.5%; PAN: 3.1%; CDU: 2.5%; Others/Invalid: 1.8%.) | 29 May–4 Jun 2024 | 604 | ? | 27.5; 7 | 28.3; 7 | | | 13.7; 3 | 6.6; 1 | 2.9; 0 | 3.5; 0 | 5.1; 1 | 10.4; 2 | 2.0; 0 | 0.8 |
| CESOP–UCP | 27 May–3 Jun 2024 | 1,552 | ? | 33; 7/9 | 31; 6/8 | | | 12; 2/4 | 4; 0/1 | 4; 0/1 | 1; 0 | 4; 0/1 | 8; 1/2 | 3; 0 | 2 |
| Aximage | 17–22 May 2024 | 801 | 55.3 | 30.6; 7/8 | 26.6; 6 | | | 15.5; 4 | 6.3; 1 | 3.5; 0 | 1.6; 0 | 5.2; 1 | 7.5; 1/2 | 3.2; 0 | 4.0 |
| Intercampus (Note: Results presented here exclude undecideds (3.7%). With their inclusion results are: PS: 22.2%; AD: 21.2%; CHEGA: 17.4%; IL: 11.6%; BE: 8.9%; Livre: 6.6%; PAN: 3.9%; CDU: 3.6%; Others/Invalid: 0.9%.) | 12–20 May 2024 | 609 | ? | 23.1; 5 | 22.0; 5 | | | 18.1; 4 | 9.2; 2 | 3.7; 0 | 4.0; 1 | 6.9; 1 | 12.0; 3 | 1.0; 0 | 1.1 |
| CESOP–UCP | 13–18 May 2024 | 965 | ? | 30; 6/8 | 31; 6/8 | | | 15; 3/4 | 5; 1 | 5; 1 | 1; 0 | 5; 1 | 6; 1/2 | 2; 0 | 1 |
| Duplimétrica | 6–13 May 2024 | 800 | ? | 34; 9 | 32; 8 | | | 10; 2 | 3; 0 | 3; 0 | 1; 0 | 3; 0 | 9; 2 | 5; 0 | 2 |
| ICS/ISCTE | 27 Apr–8 May 2024 | 1,001 | ? | 32; 8 | 26; 6 | | | 18; 4 | 5; 1 | 4; 1 | 2; 0 | 2; 0 | 4; 1 | 7; 0 | 6 |
| Intercampus (Note: Results presented here exclude undecideds (17.5%). With their inclusion results are: PS: 27.5%; AD: 23.2%; CHEGA: 10.7%; BE: 6.1%; Livre: 4.8%; IL: 3.6%; CDU: 2.7%; PAN: 1.1%; Others/Invalid: 2.7%.) | 18–23 Apr 2024 | 605 | ? | 33.4; 8 | 28.2; 7 | | | 13.0; 3 | 7.4; 1 | 3.3; 0 | 1.3; 0 | 5.8; 1 | 4.4; 1 | 3.3; 0 | 5.2 |
| Aximage | 12–16 Apr 2024 | 805 | 58.0 | 31.3; 7/8 | 24.8; 6 | | | 18.4; 4 | 5.9; 1 | 4.1; 1 | 1.8; 0 | 3.6; 0/1 | 5.8; 1 | 4.3; 0 | 6.5 |
| 2024 legislative elections | 10 Mar 2024 | — | 59.8 | 28.0 (7) | 28.8 (7) | | | 18.1 (5) | 4.4 (1) | 3.2 (0) | 1.9 (0) | 3.2 (0) | 4.9 (1) | 7.5 (0) | 0.8 |
| Ipsos | 23 Feb–5 Mar 2024 | 2,000 | ? | 29.6; 8 | 31.0; 8 | 3.4; 0 | – | 14.2; 3 | 4.4; 1 | 2.3; 0 | 2.1; 0 | 3.6; 0 | 4.5; 1 | 4.9; 0 | 1.4 |
| 2022 legislative elections | 30 Jan 2022 | — | 51.5 | 41.4 (10) | 29.1 (7) | 1.6 (0) | 0.0 (0) | 7.2 (1) | 4.4 (1) | 4.3 (1) | 1.6 (0) | 1.3 (0) | 4.9 (1) | 4.7 (0) | 12.3 |
| 2019 legislative elections | 6 Oct 2019 | — | 48.6 | 36.3 (10) | 27.8 (7) | 4.2 (1) | 0.2 (0) | 1.3 (0) | 9.5 (2) | 6.3 (1) | 3.3 (0) | 1.1 (0) | 1.3 (0) | 8.8 (0) | 8.5 |
| 2019 EP election | 26 May 2019 | — | 30.7 | 33.4; 9 | 21.9; 6 | 6.2; 1 | 1.5; 0 | | 9.8; 2 | 6.9; 2 | 5.1; 1 | 1.8; 0 | 0.9; 0 | 12.5; 0 | 11.5 |

=== Romania ===
| Polling firm | Fieldwork date | Sample size | CNR | | PUSL S&D | AUR+ | | ADU | | | PRO S&D | UDMR EPP | AER | | AD ECR | S.O.S. NI | REPER Renew | Others | Lead |
| Polling firm | Fieldwork date | Sample size | PNL EPP | PSD S&D | PUSL S&D | PNCR ECR | AUR ECR | FD EPP | PMP EPP | USR Renew | PRO S&D | UDMR EPP | PER NI | PV G/EFA | AD ECR | S.O.S. NI | REPER Renew | Others | Lead |
|---|---|---|---|---|---|---|---|---|---|---|---|---|---|---|---|---|---|---|---|
| INSCOP | 20 - 25 May 2024 | 1,100 | 43.7 | | 1.3 | 17.5 | | 14.1 | | | — | 6.0 | — | — | — | 4.4 | 1.3 | 11.7 | 26.2 |
| Sociopol | 17–22 May 2024 | 1,002 | 47 | | 2 | — | 21 | 15 | | | — | 5 | — | — | 0 | 2 | 4 | 4 (Note: Independents 4%, Greater Romania Party 0%, Socialist Romania 0%, Patriotic Party 0%, United Diaspora Party 0%) | 24 |
| CSPS | 7–15 May 2024 | 2,613 | 27 | | — | — | 34 | 25 | | | — | 7 | — | — | — | 3 | 4 | 3 | 7 |
| INSCOP | 12–20 April 2024 | 1,100 | 46.6 | | 1.5 | — | 16.7 | 13.8 | | | 2.7 | 5.1 | 2.4 | 2.0 | — | 4.5 | 1.8 | 2.8 | 29.9 |
| CSPS | 1-7 April 2024 | 4,085 | 27.2 | | — | — | 30.2 | 23.4 | | | — | 4.8 | — | — | — | 2.8 | 5.8 | 5.7 | 3 |
| Sociopol | 26 March-2 April 2024 | 1,002 | 47 | | 5 | — | 23 | 14 | | | 1 | 4 | 2 | — | — | 3 | 0 | 1 | 24 |
| CURS | 19-28 March 2024 | 1,067 | 53 | | 4 | — | 14 | 14 | | | — | 5 | — | — | — | 5 | — | 5 | 39 |
| CSPS | 17-29 March 2024 | 2,088 | 37 | | — | — | 27 | 21 | | | — | 4 | — | — | — | — | — | 11 | 10 |
| Euractiv | March 2024 | — | 42 | | — | — | 25 | 14 | | | 2 | 5 | — | — | — | 5 | 1 | 6 | 17 |
| Ipsos | 23 Feb–5 Mar 2024 | 970 | 42.4 | | 3.0 | — | 20.7 | 14.2 | | | 5.1 | 3.4 | — | — | — | 5.9 | — | 5.2 | 21.7 |
| INSCOP | 22-29 Feb 2024 | 1,100 | 43.7 | | — | — | 20.6 | 13.7 | | | 3.7 | 3.9 | 3.4 | | — | 6.4 | 0.9 | 3.7 | 23.1 |
| Sociopol | Feb 2024 | – | 42 | | 1 | — | 28 | 15 | | | 2 | 5 | 2 | — | 0 | 3 | 1 | 1 (Note: Independents 1%, Sovereign Romania Party 0%) | 14 |
| Sociopol | Feb 2024 | – | 17 | 31 | 1 | — | 24 | 13 | | | 2 | 5 | 2 | — | 0 | 3 | 1 | 1 (Note: Independents 1%, Sovereign Romania Party 0%) | 14 |
| INSOMAR | Feb 2024 | 1,030 | 40.8 | | 1.5 | — | 30.5 | 11.5 | | | 1.7 | 4.5 | — | — | — | 2 | — | 7.5 (Note: Romanian Sovereigntist Bloc (NI): 4.2%) | 10.3 |
| Avangarde | 19–20 Feb 2024 | 950 | 20 | 31 | — | — | 18 | 15 | | | — | 5 | — | — | — | 8 | 2 | 1 | 11 |
| CURS | 3–14 Feb 2024 | 1,067 | 20 | 31 | 2 | — | 20 | 13 | | | 2 | 4 | — | — | — | 4 | — | 4 (Note: Party of the Patriots: 2%) | 11 |
| 60m.ro | 20 Jan 2024 | 927 | 16 | 28 | — | — | 30 | 17 | | | — | 5 | — | — | — | 4 | — | — | 2 |
| INSCOP | 16-24 Jan 2024 | 1,100 | 18.8 | 29.5 | — | — | 18.4 | 12.9 | | | 3.0 | 4.8 | 3.5 | | — | 6.5 | 0.5 | 2 | 10.7 |
| CURS | 15–27 Jan 2024 | 1,082 | 19 | 30 | 3 | — | 21 | 14 | | | — | 5 | — | — | — | 4 | — | 4 | 9 |
| Avangarde | 8-22 Jan 2024 | 1,150 | 21 | 31 | — | — | 19 | 14 | | | — | 5 | — | — | — | 8 | 1 | 1 | 10 |
| INSOMAR | Jan 2024 | 1,050 | 21 | 25 | — | — | 22 | — | 2 | 9 | 1 | 3 | — | — | — | 3 | — | 9 (Note: Romanian Sovereigntist Bloc (NI): 3%) | 3 |
| Sociopol | Jan 2024 | – | 17 | 29 | 1 | 0 | 23 | 13 | | | 2 | 5 | 2 | — | 1 | 3 | 1 | 1 (Note: Independents 2%, ALDE 0%, Sovereign Romania Party 0%) | 6 |
| CIRA | Jan 2024 | 1,000 | 20 | 30 | — | — | 18 | 2 | 2 | 14 | — | 5 | — | — | — | 6 | 2 | 1 | 10 |
| CURS | 26–30 Dec 2023 | 852 | 19 | 31 | 4 | — | 19 | 1 | 4 | 9 | 2 | 4 | — | — | — | 5 | — | 2 | 12 |
| Mercury Research | 30 Oct–6 Nov 2023 | 1,227 | 16 | 26 | 0 | — | 19 | 22 | | | — | 3 | — | — | — | 7 | 1 | 5 | 4 |
| Mercury Research | 30 Oct–6 Nov 2023 | 1,227 | 16 | 28 | 1 | — | 19 | 2 | 4 | 15 | — | 3 | — | — | — | 7 | 1 | 3 | 9 |
| Avangarde | 20–28 Sep 2023 | 994 | 21 | 31 | — | — | 19 | 1 | 3 | 13 | 1 | 5 | — | — | — | 5 | — | 1 | 10 |
| LARICS | 11–25 Sep 2023 | 1,003 | 22.9 | 31.5 | 1.0 | — | 14.6 | — | 4.4 | 15.2 | — | 3.2 | — | — | — | 4.7 | — | 2.4 | 8.6 |
| INSOMAR | 28–31 Aug 2023 | 1,030 | 15 | 25 | 2 | — | 27 | 3 | 3 | 7 | — | 4 | — | — | — | 4 | — | 10 | 2 |
| 2020 parliamentary election | 6 Dec 2020 | 6.058.625 | 25.2 | 28.9 | 1.0 | — | 9.1 | — | 4.9 | 15.4 | 4.1 | 5.7 | 1.3 | 0.4 | 0.0 | — | — | 4.1 | 3.7 |
| 2019 election | 26 May 2019 | 9.069.822 | 27.0 | 22.5 | | | — | — | 5.8 | 22.4 | 6.4 | 5.3 | — | — | — | — | — | 6.6 | 4.5 |

=== Slovenia ===
| Fieldwork date | Polling firm | Publisher(s) | Sample size | SDS EPP | SLS (Gregorčič) EPP | ZS NI | SD S&D | NSi EPP | Levica Left | DeSUS EDP | DD NI | GS Renew | Resni.ca NI | PPS G/EFA | Vesna (Prebilič) G/EFA | NOT NI | Logar NI | Rupar NI | Others | None | Und. | Abst. | Lead | Source |
|---|---|---|---|---|---|---|---|---|---|---|---|---|---|---|---|---|---|---|---|---|---|---|---|---|
| 3–6 Jun 2024 | Ninamedia | Dnevnik | 629 | 25.1 | 6.4 | 2.1 | 10.3 | 6.8 | 4.8 | 4.4 | | 19.5 | 5.4 | – | 13.1 | 2.1 | – | – | – | – | – | – | 5.6 | |
| 3–5 Jun 2024 | Mediana | Delo | 734 | 20.5; 3 | 6.0; 0 | 1.5; 0 | 6.5; 1 | 7.8; 1 | 4.4; 0 | 1.9; 0 | | 18.4; 3 | 3.9; 0 | – | 7.7; 1 | 1.5; 0 | – | – | 19.9 | | | | 2.1 | |
| 21–24 May 2024 | Mediana | POPTV | 713 | 17.9; 4 | 3.0; 0 | 2.6; 0 | 9.1; 1 | 6.0; 1 | 4.1; 0 | 1.4; 0 | | 12.8; 2 | 5.5; 0 | – | 8.1; 1 | 0.9; 0 | – | – | 0.1; 0 | 4.0 | 14.7 | 6.2 | 5.1 | |
| 13–16 May 2024 | Ninamedia | Dnevnik | 1,000 | 27.4; 3 | 4.4; 0 | 3.6; 0 | 11.5; 1 | 7.9; 1 | 5.7; 0 | 2.8; 0 | | 17.6; 2 | 3.2; 0 | – | 14.0; 1 | 1.7; 0 | – | – | – | – | – | – | 9.8 | |
| 23–25 Apr 2024 | Mediana | POPTV | 723 | 21.7 | 3.3 | – | 5.7 | 7.1 | 3.0 | 2.6 | | 15.5 | 3.1 | 2.8 | 7.1 | 0.9 | – | – | 0.2 | 4.3 | 14.7 | 4.2 | 6.2 | |
| 22–25 Apr 2024 | Parsifal | Nova24TV | 863 | 24.5 | 2.8 | – | 6.8 | 6.3 | 4.3 | 1.7 | | 12.5 | 4.5 | 2.2 | 2.7 | – | – | – | 0.1 | 5.7 | 18.7 | 7.2 | 12.0 | |
| 5–7 Mar 2024 | Mediana | Delo | 723 | 20.7 | 2.4 | – | 6.4 | 6.2 | 4.5 | – | – | 13.0 | 4.1 | 3.3 | 3.3 | – | – | 2.7 | 1.7 | 6.4 | 18.6 | 4.3 | 7.7 | |
| 4–7 Dec 2023 | Ninamedia | – | 700 | 14.6 | 3.7 | – | 11.4 | 6.3 | 4.0 | – | – | 11.6 | – | – | 8.3 | – | 12.4 | 0.9 | – | – | 19.7 | 7.1 | 2.2 | |
| 24 April 2022 | 2022 parliamentary election | – | – | 23.48 | 3.41 | | 6.69 | 6.86 | 4.46 | 0.66 | 1.70 | 40.23 (Note: Compared with the 2022 results of GS + LMŠ and SAB which have both merged with GS) | 2.86 | 1.63 | 1.35 | — | — | — | 6.13 | (29.04) | | | 16.75 | |
| 26 May 2019 | 2019 election | – | – | 26.25 | | 2.22 | 18.66 | 11.12 | 6.43 | 5.67 | 0.53 | 19.46 (Note: Compared with the 2019 results of LMŠ and SAB which have both merged with GS) | — | — | — | — | — | — | 9.67 | (71.11) | | | 6.79 | |

=== Slovakia ===
| Polling firm | Date | Sample size | PS Renew | Democrats EPP | Smer NI | ĽSNS NI | Život NI | SNS ID | KDH EPP | SASKA ECR | KÚ ECR | OĽaNO EPP | ZĽ EPP | MA EPP | SR ID | Hlas NI | Republika NI | Others | Lead |
|---|---|---|---|---|---|---|---|---|---|---|---|---|---|---|---|---|---|---|---|
| Ipsos | 30 May–4 Jun 2024 | 1,225 | 21.9; 4 | 5.2; 1 | 24.6; 4 | 1.0; 0 | 3.2; 0 | | 6.3; 1 | 5.7; 1 | 1.5; 0 | 4.4; 0 | | 5.1; 1 | — | 11.2; 2 | 8.7; 1 | 1.2 (Note: Common Sense 0.7%) | 2.7 |
| NMS | 30 May–3 Jun 2024 | 1,020 | 23.2; 5 | 3.3; 0 | 22.1; 4 | 0.7; 0 | 3.1; 0 | | 5.0; 1 | 6.4; 1 | 1.2; 0 | 3.2; 0 | | 3.7; 0 | — | 11.9; 2 | 11.0; 2 | 5.1 | 1.1 |
| Median | 21–27 May 2024 | 640 | 20.6 | 4.9 | 22.5 | 1.4 | 2.3 | | 7.2 | 7.0 | — | 6.6 | | 3.3 | — | 14.0 | 9.4 | 0.8 | 1.9 |
| Ipsos | 14–21 May 2024 | 414 | 23.5; 4 | 3.4; 0 | 24.4; 4 | 1.7; 0 | 4.0; 0 | | 7.1; 1 | 5.7; 1 | — | 5.3; 1 | | 4.8; 0 | — | 10.3; 2 | 9.0; 2 | 0.8 | 0.9 |
| NMS | 9–13 May 2024 | 1,020 | 23.4; 5 | 3.5; 0 | 17.3; 4 | 0.9; 0 | 3.0; 0 | | 4.8; 0 | 7.4; 1 | 1.6; 0 | 4.8; 0 | | 3.1; 0 | — | 11.2; 2 | 12.6; 3 | 6.3 (Note: Common Sense 2.2, MySlovensko 0.8, KSS 0.7, SOS 0.5, Slovak PATRIOT 0.4, SDKÚ-DS 0.4, Socialisti.sk 0.3, SOSK 0.3, Volt 0.3, SRDCE 0.2, Piráti 0.2, SĽS 0.0) | 6.1 |
| AKO | 7–14 May 2024 | 1,000 | 25.6; 4 | 3.4; 0 | 17.6; 3 | 1.0; 0 | 5.2; 1 | | 7.0; 1 | 6.7; 1 | 0.6; 0 | 2.7; 0 | | 3.7; 0 | — | 14.4; 3 | 8.5; 2 | 3.6 | 8.0 |
| NMS | 18–24 April 2024 | 1,010 | 24.3; 5 | 4.4; 0 | 19.8; 4 | 0.7; 0 | 3.2; 0 | | 4.6; 0 | 7.0; 1 | 0.8; 0 | 3.6; 0 | | 2.9; 0 | — | 12.0; 3 | 10.7; 2 | 5.8 (Note: Common Sense 2.2, MySlovensko 0.6, Piráti 0.6, Slovak PATRIOT 0.6, SOS 0.5, SDKÚ-DS 0.4, Socialisti.sk 0.3, SOSK 0.2, SRDCE 0.2, Volt 0.1, KSS 0.1, SĽS 0.0%) | 4.5 |
| AKO | 9–16 April 2024 | 1,000 | 27.2; 5 | 2.7; 0 | 15.2; 3 | 1.0; 0 | 4.1; 0 | | 6.7; 1 | 6.5; 1 | 0.8; 0 | 3.2; 0 | | 5.0; 1 | — | 14.2; 3 | 7.5; 1 | 5.9 (Note: Common Sense 1.5, SRDCE 1.2, SOSK 0.7, KSS 0.7, SDKÚ-DS 0.5, Piráti 0.5, MySlovensko 0.5, SĽS 0.3, SOS 0.1, Volt 0.1, Slovak PATRIOT 0.0, Socialisti.sk 0.0) | 12.0 |
| Ipsos | 23 Feb – 5 Mar 2024 | 1,502 | 24.6; 5 | 2.3; 0 | 26.7; 5 | 2.1; 0 | 4.8; 0 | | 8.2; 2 | 4.6; 0 | 4.9; 0 | | | 2.4; 0 | — | 11.8; 2 | 6.4; 1 | 1.2 | 2.1 |
| 2023 elections | 30 Sep 2023 | 2,967,896 | 17.96 | 2.21 | 22.95 | 0.84 | 5.63 | | 6.82 | 6.32 | 8.90 | | | 4.39 | 2.93 | 14.70 | 4.75 | 1.60 | 4.99 |
| 2020 elections | 29 Feb 2020 | 2,881,511 | 6.97 | | 18.29 | 7.97 | | 3.16 | 4.65 | 6.22 | 25.03 | | 5.77 | 3.91 | 8.24 | — | — | 9.34 | 6.74 |
| 2019 elections | 25 May 2019 | 985,680 | 20.11; 4 | | 15.72; 3 | 12.07; 2 | 2.07; 0 | 4.09; 0 | 9.70; 2 | 9.62; 2 | 3.85; 0 | 5.26; 1 | — | 4.96; 0 | 3.23; 0 | — | — | 9.32 | 4.29 |

=== Spain ===
The table below lists weighted voting intention estimates. Refusals are generally excluded from the party vote percentages, while question wording and the treatment of "don't know" responses and those not intending to vote may vary between polling organisations. When available, seat projections determined by the polling organisations are displayed below (or in place of) the percentages in a smaller font.

Color key:

Poll conducted after legal ban on opinion polls

| Polling firm/Commissioner | Fieldwork date | Sample size | Turnout | PSOE | PP | Cs | Podemos | Vox | AR | JxCat Junts | CEUS | Más País | PACMA | Sumar | SALF | Lead |
|---|---|---|---|---|---|---|---|---|---|---|---|---|---|---|---|---|
| 2024 EP election | 9 Jun 2024 | — | 46.4 | 30.2; 20 | 34.2; 22 | 0.7; 0 | 3.3; 2 | 9.6; 6 | 4.9; 3 | 2.5; 1 | 1.6; 1 | (Note: Within Sumar.) | 0.8; 0 | 4.7; 3 | 4.6; 3 | 4.0 |
| SocioMétrica/El Español | 30 Apr–9 Jun 2024 | 4,612 | ? | 28.7; 19/20 | 34.5; 23/25 | 1.0; 0 | 4.2; 2/3 | 10.5; 6/7 | 4.2; 2/3 | 2.3; 1 | 1.4; 0/1 | | – | 6.3; 3/4 | 2.9; 1/2 | 5.8 |
| Sigma Dos/RTVE–FORTA | 24 May–8 Jun 2024 | 12,000 | ? | 30.2; 20/22 | 32.4; 21/23 | 1.0; 0 | 4.4; 2/3 | 10.4; 6/7 | 4.3; 2/3 | 2.1; 1 | 1.6; 1 | | – | 6.3; 3/4 | 3.9; 2/3 | 2.2 |
| 40dB/Prisa | 6 Jun 2024 | 800 | ? | 29.7; 20 | 32.4; 22 | ? 0 | 4.0; 2/3 | 10.3; 6/7 | 4.3; 2/3 | 2.4; 1 | 1.6; 0/1 | | – | 6.0; 3/4 | 3.1; 1/2 | 2.7 |
| Metroscopia | 3–6 Jun 2024 | 2,000 | ? | 30.1; 20/21 | 32.6; 22/23 | 0.4; 0 | 4.9; 3 | 10.1; 6/7 | 4.5; 3 | 2.0; 1 | 1.8; 1 | | – | 5.4; 3/4 | 3.6; 2 | 2.5 |
| KeyData/Público | 3 Jun 2024 | ? | 51.5 | 30.0; 20 | 33.9; 23 | 1.0; 0 | 3.7; 2 | 9.9; 6 | 4.4; 3 | 2.4; 1 | 1.7; 1 | | – | 6.1; 4 | 2.8; 1 | 3.9 |
| Data10/Okdiario | 2–3 Jun 2024 | 1,500 | ? | 30.2; 20 | 34.4; 23 | 1.0; 0 | 3.9; 2 | 10.3; 7 | 4.4; 3 | 2.5; 1 | 1.6; 1 | | – | 6.2; 4 | – | 4.2 |
| ElectoPanel/Electomanía | 1–3 Jun 2024 | 1,422 | ? | 30.2; 21 | 32.9; 23 | 0.8; 0 | 3.6; 2 | 9.5; 6 | 4.2; 2 | 2.5; 1 | 1.7; 1 | | 1.2; 0 | 5.9; 4 | 2.5; 1 | 2.7 |
| Sigma Dos/El Mundo | 27 May–3 Jun 2024 | 3,535 | ? | 30.3; 20/21 | 33.2; 22/23 | ? 0 | 4.1; 2/3 | 10.5; 6/7 | 4.3; 2/3 | 1.9; 1 | 1.4; 0/1 | | – | 6.0; 4 | 3.4; 2 | 2.9 |
| SocioMétrica/El Español | 30 May–2 Jun 2024 | 630 | ? | 29.3; 20 | 34.1; 23 | 0.9; 0 | 3.7; 2 | 10.1; 7 | 3.8; 2 | 2.8; 1 | 1.6; 1 | | – | 6.3; 4 | 2.7; 1 | 4.8 |
| Cluster17/Agenda Pública | 29–31 May 2024 | 2,060 | ? | 29.5; 20/21 | 33.8; 22/23 | ? 0 | 3.5; 2 | 10.3; 6/7 | 4.5; 3 | 2.6; 1 | 1.7; 1 | | – | 5.9; 3/4 | 2.3; 1 | 4.3 |
| Target Point/El Debate | 29–31 May 2024 | 1,003 | ? | 31.0; 20/21 | 33.5; 22/23 | ? 0 | 3.9; 2 | 8.9; 5/6 | ? 3 | 2.4; 1 | ? 1 | | – | 6.0; 4 | 2.9; 1/2 | 2.5 |
| GESOP/Prensa Ibérica | 27–31 May 2024 | 630 | ? | 31.5; 21/22 | 32.0; 21/22 | 0.9; 0 | 4.4; 2/3 | 8.1; 5/6 | 5.0; 3 | 2.0; 1 | 1.8; 1 | | – | 5.8; 3/4 | 3.7; 1/2 | 0.5 |
| NC Report/La Razón | 27–31 May 2024 | 1,000 | 50.8 | 29.2; 20 | 35.0; 23/24 | ? 0 | 3.6; 2 | 9.9; 6/7 | 4.9; 3 | 2.8; 1 | 1.9; 1 | | – | 6.4; 4 | 2.2; 1 | 5.8 |
| ElectoPanel/Electomanía | 25–31 May 2024 | 3,109 | ? | 30.0; 20 | 33.5; 23 | 0.8; 0 | 3.3; 2 | 9.2; 6 | 4.5; 3 | 2.5; 1 | 2.0; 1 | | 1.3; 0 | 6.3; 4 | 2.0; 1 | 3.5 |
| Sigma Dos/El Mundo | 24–31 May 2024 | 3,948 | ? | 29.7; 19/21 | 32.7; 21/23 | 0.8; 0 | 4.0; 2/3 | 11.0; 6/7 | 3.8; 2 | 1.9; 1 | 1.3; 0/1 | | – | 6.9; 4/5 | 3.5; 2 | 3.0 |
| Hamalgama Métrica/VozPópuli | 23–31 May 2024 | 1,000 | ? | 29.6; 20 | 35.1; 23 | 0.9; 0 | 3.5; 2 | 10.2; 6 | 4.5; 3 | 2.5; 1 | ? 1 | | – | 6.3; 4 | 2.0; 1 | 5.5 |
| 40dB/Prisa | 28–30 May 2024 | 2,000 | ? | 30.1; 20/21 | 33.2; 22/23 | 1.0; 0 | 4.0; 2/3 | 10.7; 7 | 4.8; 3 | 2.1; 1 | 1.4; 0/1 | | – | 5.6; 3/4 | 2.5; 1/2 | 3.1 |
| GAD3/ABC | 27–30 May 2024 | 1,005 | ? | 29.8; 20 | 34.9; 23/24 | ? 0 | 3.5; 2 | 9.7; 6 | 4.8; 3 | 2.4; 1 | 1.9; 1 | | – | 5.9; 3/4 | 2.4; 1 | 5.1 |
| CIS | 27–30 May 2024 | 7,491 | ? | 31.6–33.2 | 28.3– 30.5 | 0.7– 1.2 | 3.6– 3.9 | 9.9– 11.0 | 3.7– 4.1 | 1.5– 1.6 | 1.0– 1.3 | | – | 5.4– 7.1 | 4.9– 5.7 | 2.7– 3.3 |
| Metroscopia | 28–29 May 2024 | 1,000 | 50 | 29.5; 20/21 | 33.6; 22/23 | 0.8; 0 | 3.6; 2 | 10.1; 6/7 | 4.7; 3/4 | 2.3; 1 | 1.8; 1 | | – | 5.9; 3/4 | 3.1; 2 | 4.1 |
| Sondaxe/La Voz de Galicia | 23–29 May 2024 | 1,005 | ? | 30.1; 20 | 34.5; 24 | 0.7; 0 | 3.8; 2 | 9.9; 6 | 4.0; 2 | 2.3; 1 | 2.1; 1 | | – | 6.4; 4 | 2.6; 1 | 4.4 |
| DYM/Henneo | 23–28 May 2024 | 1,004 | ? | 30.8; 20/21 | 34.4; 23 | 1.3; 0 | 3.3; 2 | 10.4; 6/7 | 4.2; 2/3 | 2.4; 1 | 1.2; 1 | | 1.5; 0/1 | 5.9; 4 | 2.8; 1 | 3.6 |
| Celeste-Tel/Onda Cero | 23–28 May 2024 | 1,100 | 49.7 | 29.3; 20 | 34.9; 23 | 1.0; 0 | 3.6; 2 | 9.9; 6 | 4.8; 3 | 2.6; 1 | 1.8; 1 | | 1.1; 0 | 6.3; 4 | 1.9; 1 | 5.6 |
| SocioMétrica/El Español | 25–26 May 2024 | 503 | ? | 29.4; 20 | 34.8; 24 | 1.4; 0 | 3.3; 2 | 10.7; 7 | 4.5; 2 | 2.7; 1 | 1.4; 0 | | – | 6.3; 4 | 2.0; 1 | 5.4 |
| KeyData/Público | 25 May 2024 | ? | 54.0 | 28.7; 19 | 35.8; 24 | 1.0; 0 | 3.1; 2 | 10.6; 7 | 4.6; 3 | 2.3; 1 | 1.5; 0 | | – | 7.4; 4 | 2.7; 1 | 7.1 |
| Data10/Okdiario | 22–24 May 2024 | 1,500 | ? | 29.6; 20 | 35.4; 24 | 0.9; 0 | 2.9; 1 | 10.4; 7 | 4.7; 3 | 2.5; 1 | 1.7; 1 | | – | 6.4; 4 | – | 5.8 |
| GAD3/Mediaset | 21–24 May 2024 | 1,002 | ? | 31.4; 21 | 34.5; 23 | 0.7; 0 | 3.0; 2 | 9.3; 6 | 4.5; 3 | 2.4; 1 | 1.5; 1 | | – | 5.7; 3 | 2.7; 1 | 3.1 |
| NC Report/La Razón | 20–24 May 2024 | 1,000 | 54.3 | 27.9; 19 | 36.1; 24/25 | ? 0 | 3.0; 2 | 9.0; 6 | 5.2; 3 | 2.9; 1/2 | 2.2; 1 | | – | 6.8; 4 | 1.2; 0 | 8.2 |
| Sigma Dos/El Mundo | 20–24 May 2024 | 2,137 | ? | 30.2; 19/20 | 35.1; 24/25 | 0.8; 0 | 3.6; 2 | 9.7; 6/7 | 3.6; 2 | 2.4; 1 | 1.3; 0/1 | | – | 7.0; 4/5 | 2.6; 1/2 | 4.9 |
| ElectoPanel/El Plural | 18–24 May 2024 | 1,500 | ? | 29.1; 20 | 33.7; 23 | 1.0; 0 | 3.1; 2 | 8.7; 6 | 5.3; 3 | 2.7; 1 | 2.1; 1 | | 1.3; 0 | 5.8; 4 | 1.8; 1 | 4.6 |
| Cluster17/Agenda Pública | 21–23 May 2024 | 1,640 | ? | 28.7; 19/20 | 34.1; 23/24 | ? 0 | 3.4; 2 | 9.6; 6 | 4.5; 3 | 2.6; 1 | 1.9; 1 | | 1.3; 0/1 | 6.7; 4 | 2.2; 1 | 5.4 |
| SocioMétrica/El Español | 17–19 May 2024 | 519 | ? | 28.8; 19 | 36.9; 25 | 0.9; 0 | 3.2; 2 | 10.4; 7 | 5.1; 3 | 2.4; 1 | 1.3; 0 | | – | 7.0; 4 | 0.8; 0 | 8.1 |
| NC Report/La Razón | 13–17 May 2024 | 1,000 | 58.9 | 27.2; 18/19 | 36.3; 24/25 | ? 0 | 2.8; 1/2 | 9.4; 6 | 4.9; 3 | 2.7; 1 | 2.1; 1 | | – | 7.7; 5 | 1.4; 0/1 | 9.1 |
| ElectoPanel/El Plural | 12–17 May 2024 | 1,250 | ? | 28.6; 20 | 34.3; 25 | 0.9; 0 | 2.5; 1 | 7.7; 5 | 5.4; 3 | 4.0; 2 | 2.4; 1 | | 1.3; 0 | 5.9; 4 | 1.1; 0 | 5.7 |
| CIS (Logoslab) (Note: Alternative projection based on raw CIS data.) | 8–17 May 2024 | 6,434 | ? | 30.5; 20/21 | 33.0; 21/22 | 1.5; 0/1 | ? 2/3 | ? 7 | ? 2/3 | ? 1 | ? 1 | | – | ? 3/4 | ? 2 | 2.5 |
| CIS | 8–17 May 2024 | 6,434 | ? | 32.8– 35.2; 21/24 | 27.9– 30.2; 18/20 | 1.8– 2.6; 1/2 | 4.4– 5.4; 2/3 | 8.6– 10.1; 5/6 | 3.9– 5.0; 2/3 | 2.2– 3.0; 1/2 | 1.1– 1.6; 0/1 | | – | 5.9– 7.2; 4 | 2.9– 3.8; 1/2 | 4.9– 5.0 |
| Cluster17/Agenda Pública | 14–16 May 2024 | 1,511 | ? | 26.4; 17/18 | 35.4; 24 | 1.2; 0/1 | 3.4; 2 | 8.8; 6 | 5.6; 3 | 2.6; 1 | 2.0; 1 | | 1.4; 0/1 | 6.6; 4 | 3.8; 2 | 9.0 |
| 40dB/Prisa | 10–13 May 2024 | 2,000 | ? | 30.1; 20/21 | 33.5; 22/23 | 1.1; 0 | 4.0; 2/3 | 12.6; 8/9 | 4.6; 3 | 2.2; 1 | 1.9; 1 | | – | 5.7; 3/4 | – | 3.4 |
| Simple Lógica/elDiario.es | 1–9 May 2024 | 1,131 | ? | 29.9; 20 | 36.4; 24 | ? 0 | 2.0; 1 | 10.9; 7 | 4.8; 3 | 2.2; 1 | 1.1; 0 | | – | 8.0; 5 | – | 6.5 |
| SocioMétrica/El Español | 30 Apr–4 May 2024 | 1,279 | ? | 26.7; 18 | 39.2; 26 | 1.2; 0 | 3.0; 2 | 10.3; 7 | 5.4; 3 | 2.3; 1 | 1.4; 1 | | – | 6.4; 4 | 0.3; 0 | 12.5 |
| Sigma Dos/El Mundo | 24–30 Apr 2024 | 2,120 | ? | 28.9; 19 | 35.7; 23 | 0.8; 0 | 3.1; 2 | 11.9; 7 | 4.1; 2 | 2.0; 1 | 1.8; 1 | | – | 9.5; 6 | – | 6.8 |
| SocioMétrica/El Español | 9–12 Apr 2024 | 2,550 | ? | 26.3; 17 | 38.1; 25 | 1.7; 1 | 2.4; 1 | 10.9; 7 | 6.1; 4 | 2.6; 1 | 1.8; 1 | | – | 6.7; 4 | – | 11.8 |
| GAD3/Mediaset | 18–21 Mar 2024 | 1,017 | ? | 26.5; 18/19 | 37.8; 25/26 | 0.3; 0 | 3.5; 2 | 9.2; 6 | 4.4; 3 | 2.7; 1 | 2.4; 1 | | – | 7.2; 4 | – | 11.3 |
| SocioMétrica/El Español | 5–9 Mar 2024 | 2,900 | ? | 24.5; 16 | 40.1; 26 | 0.9; 0 | 1.9; 1 | 10.6; 7 | 4.9; 3 | 3.0; 2 | 1.2; 0 | | – | 9.3; 6 | – | 15.6 |
| Ipsos/Euronews | 23 Feb–5 Mar 2024 | 2,000 | ? | 28.6; 19 | 37.7; 25 | ? 0 | 2.4; 1 | 10.4; 6 | 3.8; 2 | 2.5; 1 | 2.0; 1 | | – | 9.7; 6 | – | 9.1 |
| GAD3/ABC | 26–29 Feb 2024 | 1,005 | ? | 27.1; 18 | 38.4; 26 | ? 0 | 3.0; 2 | 8.6; 6 | 4.3; 2 | 2.7; 1 | 2.4; 1 | | – | 7.3; 5 | – | 11.3 |
| SocioMétrica/El Español | 5–9 Feb 2024 | 2,900 | ? | 28.1; 18 | 38.3; 25 | ? 0 | 1.0; 0 | 11.7; 7 | 3.2; 2 | 3.4; 2 | 1.5; 1 | | – | 10.2; 6 | – | 10.2 |
| NC Report/La Razón | 12–18 Jan 2024 | 1,000 | 61.5 | 28.3; 18 | 37.5; 25 | 0.4; 0 | 1.7; 1 | 10.4; 6 | 3.0; 2 | 3.3; 2 | 2.1; 1 | | – | 9.1; 6 | – | 9.2 |
| SocioMétrica/El Español | 25–31 Dec 2023 | 2,309 | ? | 28.5; 19 | 37.1; 24 | 1.1; 0 | 3.3; 2 | 11.0; 7 | 3.2; 2 | 4.4; 2 | 1.3; 0 | | – | 8.8; 5 | – | 8.6 |
| Sigma Dos/El Mundo | 15–26 Dec 2023 | 2,992 | ? | 29.2; 19 | 38.1; 25 | 0.2; 0 | 2.6; 1 | 11.8; 7 | 2.8; 1 | 2.3; 1 | 2.0; 1 | | – | 10.1; 6 | – | 8.9 |
| SocioMétrica/El Español | 20–24 Nov 2023 | 2,109 | ? | 29.2; 19 | 36.8; 25 | 1.1; 0 | 2.0; 1 | 10.2; 6 | 4.2; 2 | 5.1; 3 | 1.3; 0 | | – | 8.0; 5 | – | 7.6 |
| 2023 general election | 23 Jul 2023 | — | 66.6 | 31.7 (20) | 33.1 (21) | – | | 12.4 (7) | 3.9 (2) | 1.7 (1) | 1.6 (1) | | 0.7 (0) | 12.3 (7) | – | 1.4 |
| November 2019 general election | 10 Nov 2019 | — | 66.2 | 28.0 (18) | 20.8 (13) | 6.8 (4) | 12.9 (8) | 15.1 (10) | 5.3 (3) | 2.2 (1) | 2.8 (1) | 2.4 (1) | 0.9 (0) | – | – | 7.2 |
| 2019 EP election | 26 May 2019 | — | 60.7 | 32.9; 21 | 20.2; 13 | 12.2; 8 | 10.1; 6 | 6.2; 4 | 5.6; 3 | 4.5; 3 | 2.8; 1 | 1.3; 0 | 1.3; 0 | – | – | 12.7 |

=== Sweden ===
| Polling execution | | | Parties | | | | | | | | | |
| Polling firm | Fieldwork date | Sample size | V Left | S S&D | MP G/EFA | C Renew | L Renew | M EPP | KD EPP | SD ECR | Oth. | Lead |
|---|---|---|---|---|---|---|---|---|---|---|---|---|
| Demoskop | 23 May–1 Jun 2024 | 3,222 | 10.0; 2 | 25.2; 6 | 11.3; 3 | 5.7; 1 | 3.1; 0 | 18.0; 4 | 5.5; 1 | 18.6; 4 | 2.7; 0 | 6.6 |
| Novus | 2–29 May 2024 | 2,325 | 10.0; 2 | 29.4; 7 | 11.0; 2 | 4.7; 1 | 5.1; 1 | 15.5; 4 | 3.8; 0 | 19.1; 4 | 1.3; 0 | 10.3 |
| Verian | 22–28 May 2024 | 1,000 | 9.5; 2 | 25.1; 6 | 10.6; 2 | 4.9; 1 | 4.7; 1 | 17.2; 4 | 5.4; 1 | 19.6; 4 | 3.1; 0 | 5.5 |
| Demoskop | 11–20 May 2024 | 2,994 | 8.7; 2 | 27.5; 7 | 9.8; 2 | 4.6; 1 | 2.8; 0 | 18.5; 4 | 3.9; 0 | 19.9; 5 | 4.3; 0 | 7.6 |
| Ipsos | 7–19 May 2024 | 1,646 | 7.6; 2 | 29.6; 7 | 10.8; 3 | 3.6; 0 | 4.7; 1 | 19.1; 4 | 3.9; 0 | 17.8; 4 | 2.9; 0 | 10.5 |
| Demoskop | 24 Apr–7 May 2024 | 3,970 | 8.7; 2 | 28.5; 6 | 9.2; 2 | 4.6; 1 | 3.2; 0 | 17.3; 4 | 4.4; 1 | 19.9; 5 | 4.2; 0 | 8.6 |
| Verian | 25–30 Apr 2024 | 1,900 | 8.8; 2 | 29.7; 7 | 9.5; 2 | 4.5; 1 | 3.7; 0 | 18.3; 4 | 4.2; 1 | 17.2; 4 | 4.2; 0 | 11.4 |
| Novus | 1–28 Apr 2024 | 2,311 | 8.5; 2 | 31.1; 8 | 10.3; 2 | 3.6; 0 | 3.8; 0 | 17.7; 4 | 3.5; 0 | 18.8; 5 | 2.6; 0 | 12.3 |
| Indikator Opinion | 28 Mar – 22 Apr 2024 | 6,943 | 8.1; 2 | 32.3; 8 | 9.7; 2 | 4.6; 1 | 3.3; 0 | 19.0; 4 | 2.3; 0 | 18.6; 4 | 2.1; 0 | 12.9 |
| Ipsos | 23 Feb – 5 Mar 2024 | 1,003 | 9.6; 2 | 30.4; 6 | 8.3; 2 | 7.0; 1 | 4.7; 1 | 16.4; 4 | 4.5; 1 | 17.5; 4 | 1.5; 0 | 12.9 |
| Novus | 19 Feb – 3 Mar 2024 | 504 | 7.3; 2 | 32.4; 7 | 8.0; 2 | 4.6; 1 | 3.3; 0 | 18.1; 4 | 4.2; 1 | 20.5; 4 | 1.7; 0 | 11.9 |
| 2022 general election | 11 Sep 2022 | – | 6.8; 1 | 30.3; 7 | 5.1; 1 | 6.7; 1 | 4.6; 1 | 19.1; 4 | 5.3; 1 | 20.5; 5 | 1.5; 0 | 9.8 |
| 2019 EP election | 26 May 2019 | – | 6.8; 1 | 23.5; 5 | 11.5; 3 | 10.8; 2 | 4.1; 1 | 16.8; 4 | 8.6; 2 | 15.3; 3 | 2.5; 0 | 6.7 |
