= 2020 United States presidential election in Florida =

- November 3, 2020
- Turnout: 77.17% (of registered voters) ▲2.69 pp

| Nominee | Donald Trump | Joe Biden |
| Party | Republican | Democratic |
| Home state | Florida | Delaware |
| Running mate | Mike Pence | Kamala Harris |
| Electoral vote | 29 | 0 |
| Popular vote | 5,668,731 | 5,297,045 |
| Percentage | 51.22% | 47.86% |

Trump
40–50%
50–60%
60–70%
70–80%
80–90%
90–100%
Biden
40–50%
50–60%
60–70%
70–80%
80–90%
90–100%
Tie/No data
President before election
Donald Trump
Republican
Elected President
Joe Biden
Democratic

The 2020 United States presidential election in Florida was held on Tuesday, November 3, 2020, as part of the 2020 United States presidential election, in which all 50 states and the District of Columbia participated. Florida voters chose electors to represent them in the Electoral College via a popular vote, pitting the Republican Party's nominee, incumbent president Donald Trump, and his running mate, Vice President Mike Pence, against Democratic Party nominee, former vice president Joe Biden, and his running mate, United States senator Kamala Harris, of California. Florida had 29 electoral votes in the Electoral College.

Florida was one of seven states as well as Washington, D.C., where Trump received a greater percentage of the two-party vote than he did in 2016. (Note: The other six states were Arkansas, California, Illinois, Hawaii, Nevada, and Utah.)

Miami Beach, Florida, which hosted the 1972 Democratic National Convention, was a finalist to host the 2020 Democratic National Convention. The other finalists were Milwaukee and Houston; Milwaukee was chosen. Florida was Trump's state of residency for this election; New York was his home state in 2016. Trump was the first nominee of either major party to be a Florida resident. Biden was selected as the Democratic nominee in the 2020 Florida Democratic presidential primary on March 17, 2020 also becoming the first former vice-president to run for president since Walter Mondale in 1984.

Before the election, aggregate polls had Biden in the lead in Florida by 1 to 3 percentage points. Despite this, Trump won by a 3.4-point margin, improving on his margin from 2016 by 2.2 points. This was the largest margin for any presidential election in Florida since 2004. The main reason was increased support for Trump among Latino voters in the state, particularly in Miami-Dade County, which Biden carried by 7.4 points, significantly less than Clinton's 29.4-point margin in 2016 and Obama's 23.7-point margin in 2012. Trump carried the Cuban vote with 56%, while Biden carried the Puerto Rican vote with 66%, and Trump and Biden split the South American vote with 50% each. Overall, Biden won 54% of Latinos.

In this election, Florida voted 7.8 points right of the nation as a whole, the furthest it has voted from the nation since 1988, when the state voted 14.6 points right of the national result. As of the 2024 presidential election, this was the only election in which Florida backed the losing candidate since 1992. Despite the overall rightward shift, Biden became the first Democrat since 1976 to win the heavily urbanized Duval County, historically a Republican stronghold and home to Jacksonville. Similarly, he became the first Democrat to win Seminole County since Harry Truman in 1948. Biden also became the first Democrat to be elected president without winning Florida since Bill Clinton in 1992.

Florida is one of only three states that voted twice for Barack Obama and thrice for Trump, the other two being Iowa and Ohio.

== Primary election ==
The primary elections were held on March 17, 2020.

=== Republican primary ===
The Florida Secretary of State declared Rocky De La Fuente to be a major candidate and thus worthy of automatic inclusion on the ballot.

2020 Florida Republican presidential primary
| Candidate | Votes | % | Estimated delegates |
|---|---|---|---|
| Donald Trump (incumbent) | 1,162,984 | 93.79 | 122 |
| Bill Weld | 39,319 | 3.17 | |
| Joe Walsh (withdrawn) | 25,464 | 2.05 | |
| Rocky De La Fuente | 12,172 | 0.98 | |
| Total | 1,239,939 | 100% | 122 |

=== Democratic primary ===
Three Democrats were still in the race by the time Florida held its primaries: Vermont senator Bernie Sanders, former vice president Joe Biden, and representative from Hawaii, Tulsi Gabbard.

The first Democratic debate took place in Miami over two nights at the end of June 2019. It was broadcast on several of the NBC networks.

Popular vote share by county Biden—40–50% Biden—50–60% Biden—60–70% Biden—70–80% Biden—80–90%

2020 Florida Democratic presidential primary
| Candidate | Votes | % | Delegates |
|---|---|---|---|
| Joe Biden | 1,077,375 | 61.95 | 162 |
| Bernie Sanders | 397,311 | 22.84 | 57 |
| Michael Bloomberg (withdrawn) (Note: Candidate withdrew after Super Tuesday when early voting had begun in a few counties.) | 146,544 | 8.43 | |
| Pete Buttigieg (withdrawn) | 39,886 | 2.29 | |
| Elizabeth Warren (withdrawn) | 32,875 | 1.89 | |
| Amy Klobuchar (withdrawn) | 17,276 | 0.99 | |
| Tulsi Gabbard | 8,712 | 0.50 | |
| Andrew Yang (withdrawn) | 5,286 | 0.30 | |
| Michael Bennet (withdrawn) | 4,244 | 0.24 | |
| Tom Steyer (withdrawn) | 2,510 | 0.14 | |
| Marianne Williamson (withdrawn) | 1,744 | 0.10 | |
| John Delaney (withdrawn) | 1,583 | 0.09 | |
| Cory Booker (withdrawn) | 1,507 | 0.09 | |
| Julián Castro (withdrawn) | 1,036 | 0.06 | |
| Joe Sestak (withdrawn) | 664 | 0.04 | |
| Deval Patrick (withdrawn) | 661 | 0.04 | |
| Total | 1,739,214 | 100% | 219 |

== General election ==
=== Final predictions ===
| Source | Ranking |
|---|---|
| The Cook Political Report | Tossup |
| Inside Elections | Tilt D (flip) |
| Sabato's Crystal Ball | Lean R |
| Politico | Tossup |
| RCP | Tossup |
| Niskanen | Tossup |
| CNN | Tossup |
| The Economist | Lean D (flip) |
| CBS News | Tossup |
| 270towin | Tossup |
| ABC News | Tossup |
| NPR | Tossup |
| NBC News | Lean D (flip) |
| 538 | Lean D (flip) |

=== Polling ===
View source data.

Aggregate polls

| Source of poll aggregation | Dates administered | Dates updated | Joe Biden Democratic | Donald Trump Republican | Other/ Undecided (Note: Calculated by taking the difference of 100% and all other candidates combined.) | Margin |
|---|---|---|---|---|---|---|
| 270 to Win | October 24 – November 1, 2020 | November 3, 2020 | 48.7% | 46.0% | 5.3% | Biden +2.7 |
| Real Clear Politics | October 28 – November 2, 2020 | November 3, 2020 | 47.9% | 47.0% | 5.1% | Biden +0.9 |
| FiveThirtyEight | until November 2, 2020 | November 3, 2020 | 49.1% | 46.6% | 4.3% | Biden +2.5 |
| Average | | | 48.6% | 46.5% | 4.9% | Biden +2.1 |

State polls

| Poll source | Date(s) administered | Sample size (Note: Key: A – all adults RV – registered voters LV – likely voters V – unclear) | Margin of error | Donald Trump Republican | Joe Biden Democratic | Jo Jorgensen Libertarian | Howie Hawkins Green | Other | Undecided |
|---|---|---|---|---|---|---|---|---|---|
| Insider Advantage/Fox 35 | Nov 1–2, 2020 (Note: Additional data sourced from FiveThirtyEight) | 400 (LV) | ± 4.4% | 48% | 47% | 2% | - | – | 3% |
| Trafalgar Group | Oct 31 – Nov 2, 2020 | 1,054 (LV) | ± 2.94% | 49% | 47% | 2% | - | 1% (Note: "Someone else" with 1%) | 1% |
| SurveyMonkey/Axios | Oct 20 – Nov 2, 2020 | 8,792 (LV) | ± 1.5% | 49% (Note: Overlapping sample with the previous SurveyMonkey/Axios poll, but more information available regarding sample size) | 49% | - | - | – | – |
| AYTM/Aspiration | Oct 30 – Nov 1, 2020 | 517 (LV) | – | 43% | 45% | - | - | – | – |
| Change Research/CNBC | Oct 29 – Nov 1, 2020 | 806 (LV) | ± 3.45% | 48% | 51% | 0% | 0% | – | 1% |
| Susquehanna Polling & Research Inc./Center for American Greatness (Note: The Center for American Greatness is a pro-Trump organization) | Oct 29 – Nov 1, 2020 | 400 (LV) | ± 4.9% | 47% | 46% | 2% | - | 2% (Note: "Refused/would not vote" with 2%; "Another candidate" with 0%) | 3% |
| Quinnipiac University | Oct 28 – Nov 1, 2020 | 1,657 (LV) | ± 2.4% | 42% | 47% | - | - | 1% | 9% |
| Swayable | Oct 27 – Nov 1, 2020 | 1,261 (LV) | ± 3.7% | 46% | 53% | 1% | 1% | – | – |
| Data for Progress | Oct 27 – Nov 1, 2020 | 1,202 (LV) | ± 2.8% | 48% | 51% | 1% | 1% | 0% (Note: "Other candidate or write-in" with 0%) | – |
| Ipsos/Reuters | Oct 27 – Nov 1, 2020 | 670 (LV) | ± 4.3% | 46% (Note: Standard VI response) | 50% | 1% | 0% | 1% (Note: West (B) with 1%; "Some other candidate" and would not vote with 0%) | – |
| Ipsos/Reuters | Oct 27 – Nov 1, 2020 | 670 (LV) | ± 4.3% | 46% (Note: If only Biden, Trump and "some other candidate" were available) | 50% | - | - | 2% (Note: "Some other candidate" with 2%; would not vote with 0%) | 2% |
| Ipsos/Reuters | Oct 27 – Nov 1, 2020 | 670 (LV) | ± 4.3% | 47% (Note: Results considering those who lean towards a given candidate among those initially predisposed towards abstention, indecision or a candidate besides Biden or Trump in the response section immediately above) | 51% | - | - | 2% (Note: "Some other candidate" with 2%) | – |
| Frederick Polls/Compete Everywhere (Note: Compete Everywhere primarily supports Democratic candidates) | Oct 30–31, 2020 | 768 (LV) | ± 3.5% | 49% | 51% | - | - | – | – |
| Pulse Opinion Research/Rasmussen Reports | Oct 29–31, 2020 | 800 (LV) | ± 3.5% | 47% | 48% | - | - | 3% (Note: "Someone else" with 3%) | – |
| Siena College/NYT Upshot | Oct 27–31, 2020 | 1,451 (LV) | ± 3.2% | 44% | 47% | 2% | 1% | 0% (Note: "Someone else" and would not vote with 0%) | 6% (Note: Includes "Refused") |
| Morning Consult | Oct 22–31, 2020 | 4,451 (LV) | ± 2% | 45% | 52% | - | - | – | – |
| St. Pete Polls | Oct 29–30, 2020 | 2,758 (LV) | ± 1.9% | 48% | 49% | 1% | - | – | 2% |
| RMG Research/PoliticalIQ | Oct 28–30, 2020 | 1,200 (LV) | ± 2.8% | 47% | 51% | - | - | 2% | 0% |
| RMG Research/PoliticalIQ | Oct 28–30, 2020 | 1,200 (LV) | ± 2.8% | 45% (Note: Results generated with high Democratic turnout model) | 52% | - | - | 2% | 0% |
| RMG Research/PoliticalIQ | Oct 28–30, 2020 | 1,200 (LV) | ± 2.8% | 48% (Note: Results generated with high Republican turnout model) | 49% | - | - | 2% | 0% |
| Targoz Market Research/PollSmart | Oct 25–30, 2020 | 1,027 (LV) | – | 47% | 51% | - | - | 2% (Note: "Not sure/Someone else/Undecided" with 2%) | – |
| AtlasIntel | Oct 28–29, 2020 | 786 (LV) | ± 3% | 48.5% | 48.5% | - | - | – | 3% |
| Public Policy Polling/Climate Power 2020 (Note: Climate Power 2020 was created by the League of Conservation Voters, which endorsed Biden prior to the sampling period) | Oct 28–29, 2020 | 941 (V) | – | 45% | 52% | - | - | – | 3% |
| Harvard-Harris/The Hill | Oct 26–29, 2020 | 1,148 (LV) | ± ≥3% | 47% | 50% | - | - | – | 3% |
| ABC/Washington Post | Oct 24–29, 2020 | 824 (LV) | ± 4% | 50% | 48% | 1% | 0% | 0% (Note: "None of these" and "Other" with 0%; would not vote with no voters) | 0% |
| Redfield & Wilton Strategies | Oct 27–28, 2020 | 1,587 (LV) | – | 46% | 50% | 1% | 0% | 0% | 3% |
| Trafalgar Group | Oct 25–28, 2020 | 1,088 (LV) | ± 2.89% | 50% | 47% | 2% | - | 1% | 1% |
| Monmouth University | Oct 24–28, 2020 | 509 (RV) | ± 4.7% | 45% | 50% | 1% | 0% | 1% (Note: "Other candidate" with 1%; "No one" with 0%) | 2% |
| Monmouth University | Oct 24–28, 2020 | 509 (LV) | ± 4.7% | 45% (Note: With a likely voter turnout model featuring high turnout) | 51% | - | - | – | – |
| Monmouth University | Oct 24–28, 2020 | 509 (LV) | ± 4.7% | 46% (Note: With a likely voter turnout model featuring low turnout) | 50% | - | - | – | – |
| SurveyMonkey/Axios | Oct 1–28, 2020 | 14,571 (LV) | – | 50% | 48% | - | - | – | – |
| Marist College/NBC | Oct 25–27, 2020 | 743 (LV) | ± 4.4% | 47% | 51% | - | - | 1% | 1% |
| Quinnipiac University | Oct 23–27, 2020 | 1,324 (LV) | ± 2.7% | 42% | 45% | - | - | 1% | 11% |
| Ipsos/Reuters | Oct 21–27, 2020 | 704 (LV) | ± 4.2% | 47% | 48% | 1% | 1% | 2% (Note: "Some other candidate" and West (B) with 1%; would not vote with 0%) | – |
| Ipsos/Reuters | Oct 21–27, 2020 | 704 (LV) | ± 4.2% | 47% | 49% | - | - | 3% (Note: "Some other candidate" with 3%; would not vote with 0%) | 2% |
| Swayable | Oct 23–26, 2020 | 605 (LV) | ± 5.4% | 51% | 46% | 2% | 1% | – | – |
| YouGov/Institute of Politics at Florida State University | Oct 16–26, 2020 | 1,200 (LV) | ± 3.2% | 46% | 48% | - | - | – | 6% |
| Wick Surveys | Oct 24–25, 2020 | 1,000 (LV) | ± 3.1% | 50% | 47% | - | - | – | – |
| Florida Atlantic University | Oct 24–25, 2020 | 937 (LV) | ± 3.1% | 48% | 50% | - | - | 2% (Note: "Someone else" with 2%) | – |
| Susquehanna Polling & Research Inc./Center for American Greatness | Oct 23–25, 2020 | 400 (LV) | ± 4.9% | 49% | 44% | 2% | - | 3% (Note: "Refused/would not vote" with 2%; "Another candidate" with 1%) | 3% |
| Univision/University of Houston/Latino; Decisions/North Star Opinion Research | Oct 17–25, 2020 | 743 (RV) | ± 3.56% | 46% | 49% | - | - | 2% | 3% |
| Ryan Tyson (R) | Released Oct 24, 2020 | – (V) (Note: Not yet released) | – | 47% | 45% | - | - | 3% (Note: "Refused" with 3%) | 4% |
| Gravis Marketing | Oct 24, 2020 | 665 (LV) | ± 3.8% | 48% | 47% | - | - | – | 5% |
| YouGov/CBS | Oct 20–23, 2020 | 1,228 (LV) | ± 3.6% | 48% | 50% | - | - | 2% (Note: "Other third party" with 2%) | 0% |
| St. Pete Polls/Florida Politics | Oct 21–22, 2020 | 2,527 (LV) | ± 2% | 47% | 49% | - | - | 2% (Note: "Third party" with 2%) | 2% |
| RMG Research/PoliticalIQ | Oct 20–22, 2020 | 800 (LV) | ± 3.5% | 48% | 50% | - | - | 1% (Note: "Some other candidate" with 1%) | 1% |
| RMG Research/PoliticalIQ | Oct 20–22, 2020 | 800 (LV) | ± 3.5% | 46% | 52% | - | - | 1% | 1% |
| RMG Research/PoliticalIQ | Oct 20–22, 2020 | 800 (LV) | ± 3.5% | 48% | 46% | - | - | 1% | 1% |
| Pulse Opinion Research/Rasmussen Reports | Oct 20–21, 2020 | 800 (LV) | ± 3.5% | 50% | 46% | - | - | 3% (Note: "Some other candidate" with 3%) | 3% |
| Ipsos/Reuters | Oct 14–21, 2020 | 662 (LV) | ± 4.3% | 46% | 51% | 1% | 0% | 2% | – |
| Ipsos/Reuters | Oct 14–21, 2020 | 662 (LV) | ± 4.3% | 46% | 50% | - | - | 1% (Note: "Some other candidate" with 1%; would not vote with 0%) | 3% |
| Citizen Data | Oct 17–20, 2020 | 1,000 (LV) | ± 3.1% | 45% | 50% | 1% | 0% | 1% | 4% |
| Civiqs/Daily Kos | Oct 17–20, 2020 | 863 (LV) | ± 3.5% | 47% | 51% | - | - | 1% | 1% |
| CNN/SSRS | Oct 15–20, 2020 | 847 (LV) | ± 4% | 46% | 50% | 1% | 1% | 0% (Note: "Other" and "None of these" with 0%) | 1% |
| Morning Consult | Oct 11–20, 2020 | 4,685 (LV) | ± 1.4% | 45% | 52% | - | - | – | – |
| Change Research/CNBC | Oct 16–19, 2020 | 547 (LV) | – | 45% | 50% | - | - | – | – |
| University of North Florida | Oct 12–16, 2020 | 863 (LV) | ± 3.3% | 47% | 48% | - | - | 1% | 3% |
| HarrisX/The Hill | Oct 12–15, 2020 | 965 (LV) | – | 48% | 48% | - | - | – | 4% |
| Ipsos/Reuters | Oct 7–14, 2020 | 653 (LV) | ± 4.4% | 47% | 50% | 0% | 0% | 2% (Note: "Some other candidate" with 2%; West (B) and would not vote with 0%) | – |
| Ipsos/Reuters | Oct 7–14, 2020 | 653 (LV) | ± 4.4% | 47% | 49% | - | - | 1% | 3% |
| Trafalgar Group | Oct 11–13, 2020 | 1,051 (LV) | ± 2.94% | 48% | 46% | 2% | 1% | 1% | 2% |
| Redfield & Wilton Strategies | Oct 10–13, 2020 | 1,519 (LV) | – | 44% | 50% | 1% | 0% | – | – |
| St. Pete Polls/Florida Politics | Oct 11–12, 2020 | 2,215 (LV) | ± 2.1% | 47% | 49% | - | - | 1% (Note: "Third party" with 1%) | 2% |
| Emerson College | Oct 10–12, 2020 | 690 (LV) | ± 3.7% | 48% (Note: With voters who lean towards a given candidate) | 51% | - | - | 1% | – |
| Mason-Dixon | Oct 8–12, 2020 | 625 (LV) | ± 4% | 45% | 48% | - | - | 1% (Note: "One of the other party or independent tickets" with 1%) | 6% |
| Clearview Research | Oct 7–12, 2020 | 550 (LV) | ± 4.18% | 40% | 47% | - | - | 4% (Note: "Someone else" with 4%) | 9% |
| Clearview Research | Oct 7–12, 2020 | 550 (LV) | ± 4.18% | 39% (Note: Under a +2 Democratic turnout model) | 48% | - | - | 4% | 9% |
| Clearview Research | Oct 7–12, 2020 | 550 (LV) | ± 4.18% | 41% (Note: Under a conservative +2 Republican turnout model) | 46% | - | - | 4% | 9% |
| Morning Consult | Oct 2–11, 2020 | 4,785 (LV) | ± 1.4% | 46% | 51% | - | - | – | – |
| Redfield & Wilton Strategies | Oct 9–10, 2020 | 750 (LV) | – | 42% | 53% | 1% | 0% | – | – |
| Florida Atlantic University | Oct 9–10, 2020 | 644 (LV) | ± 3.8% | 47% | 51% | - | - | 2% | – |
| RMG Research/PoliticalIQ | Oct 4–8, 2020 | 800 (LV) | – | 46% | 48% | 1% | 1% | 1% | 4% |
| RMG Research/PoliticalIQ | Oct 4–8, 2020 | 800 (LV) | – | 44% | 50% | 1% | 1% | 1% | 4% |
| RMG Research/PoliticalIQ | Oct 4–8, 2020 | 800 (LV) | – | 47% | 46% | 1% | 1% | 1% | 4% |
| Insider Advantage/Insider Advantage/Hannity Exclusive (R) | Oct 6–7, 2020 | 400 (LV) | ± 4.9% | 49% | 46% | 1% | - | – | 10% |
| YouGov/CCES | Sep 29 – Oct 7, 2020 | 3,755 (LV) | – | 47% | 49% | - | - | – | – |
| Ipsos/Reuters | Sep 29 – Oct 7, 2020 | 678 (LV) | ± 4.3% | 45% | 49% | - | - | 1% | 5% |
| Redfield & Wilton Strategies | Oct 4–6, 2020 | 998 (LV) | ± 3.1% | 44% | 49% | 1% | 0% | 1% (Note: "Another Third Party/Write-in" with 1%) | 6% |
| Quinnipiac University | Oct 1–5, 2020 | 1,256 (LV) | ± 2.8% | 40% | 51% | - | - | 1% | 7% |
| Change Research/CNBC | Oct 2–4, 2020 | 560 (LV) | – | 46% | 50% | - | - | – | – |
| Suffolk University/USA Today | Oct 1–4, 2020 | 500 (LV) | ± 4.4% | 45% | 45% | 2% | 0% (Note: No voters) | 2% (Note: "Refused" with 2%; La Riva (PSOL) with 1%; Blankenship (C), Fuente (A) and "other" with no voters) | 6% |
| Suffolk University/USA Today | Oct 1–4, 2020 | 500 (LV) | ± 4.4% | 46% (Note: With the preferences of La Riva and Jorgensen voters in an election featuring only Biden and Trump) | 45% | - | - | 2% (Note: "Refused" with 2%; "Other" with 0%) | 7% |
| University of North Florida | Oct 1–4, 2020 | 3,134 (LV) | ± 1.8% | 45% | 51% | - | - | 1% | 3% |
| St. Leo University | Sep 27 – Oct 2, 2020 | 489 (LV) | – | 44% | 50% | - | - | – | 5% |
| Siena College/NYT Upshot | Sep 30 – Oct 1, 2020 | 710 (LV) | ± 4.2% | 42% | 47% | 2% | 1% | 0% | 8% |
| SurveyMonkey/Axios | Sep 1–30, 2020 | 12,962 (LV) | – | 47% | 51% | - | - | – | 2% |
| Cherry Communications/Florida Chamber of Commerce | Sep 23–29, 2020 | 600 (LV) | ± 4% | 44% | 49% | - | - | – | – |
| Susquehanna Polling & Research Inc./Center for American Greatness | Sep 23–26, 2020 | 500 (LV) | ± 4.3% | 43% | 46% | 3% | - | – | 8% |
| Redfield & Wilton Strategies | Sep 23–25, 2020 | 1,073 (LV) | ± 2.99% | 43% | 48% | 1% | 1% | 1% | 7% |
| St. Pete Polls | Sep 21–22, 2020 | 2,906 (LV) | ± 1.8% | 47% | 50% | - | - | 2% | 2% |
| Data For Progress (Note: Poll sponsored by the Defend Students Action Fund.) | Sep 15–22, 2020 | 620 (LV) | ± 3.9% | 43% | 46% | - | - | – | 11% |
| Change Research/CNBC | Sep 18–20, 2020 | 702 (LV) | – | 46% | 49% | - | - | – | – |
| ABC/Washington Post | Sep 15–20, 2020 | 613 (LV) | ± 4.5% | 51% | 47% | - | - | 1% (Note: "Neither" with 1%; "other" and would not vote with no voters) | 1% |
| Hart Research Associates/Human Rights Campaign (Note: The Human Rights Campaign endorsed Biden prior to this poll's sampling period) | Sep 17–19, 2020 | 400 (LV) | ± 4.9% | 45% | 51% | - | - | – | – |
| YouGov/CBS | Sep 15–18, 2020 | 1,205 (LV) | ± 3.7% | 46% | 48% | - | - | 1% (Note: "Someone else/third party" with 1%) | 5% |
| Ipsos/Reuters | Sep 11–17, 2020 | 586 (LV) | ± 4.6% | 47% | 47% | - | - | 2% | 4% |
| Redfield & Wilton Strategies | Sep 12–14, 2020 | 1,158 (LV) | ± 2.88% | 44% | 47% | 1% | 1% | 1% | 6% |
| Monmouth University | Sep 10–13, 2020 | 428 (RV) | ± 4.7% | 45% | 50% | 2% | 0% | 1% (Note: "No one" with 1%) | 3% |
| Monmouth University | Sep 10–13, 2020 | 428 (LV) | ± 4.7% | 45% (Note: With a likely voter turnout model featuring higher turnout than in the 2016 presidential election) | 50% | - | - | 1% (Note: "Other" with 1%) | 3% |
| Monmouth University | Sep 10–13, 2020 | 428 (LV) | ± 4.7% | 46% (Note: With a likely voter turnout model featuring lower turnout than in the 2016 presidential election) | 49% | - | - | 1% | 3% |
| Kaiser Family Foundation/Cook Political Report | Aug 29 – Sep 13, 2020 | 1,009 (RV) | ± 4.0% | 42% | 43% | - | - | 4% (Note: "Someone else" with 2%; "Refused" and would not vote with 1%) | 11% |
| Florida Atlantic University | Sep 11–12, 2020 | 631 (LV) | ± 3.8% | 50% | 50% | - | - | 0% (Note: "Someone else" with 0%) | – |
| St. Pete Polls/Florida Politics/AARP | Sep 7–8, 2020 | 2,689 (LV) | ± 1.9% | 47% | 50% | - | - | 2% | 2% |
| Benenson Strategy Group/GS Strategy Group/AARP | Aug 30 – Sep 8, 2020 | 1,600 (LV) | ± 2.5% | 46% | 48% | - | - | 2% (Note: Would not vote with 2%) | 4% |
| Morning Consult | Aug 29 – Sep 7, 2020 | 3,914 (LV) | ± (2%-4%) | 43% (Note: Overlapping sample with the previous Morning Consult poll, but more information available regarding sample size) | 50% | - | - | – | – |
| Change Research/CNBC | Sep 4–6, 2020 | 1,144 (LV) | – | 46% | 49% | - | - | 4% (Note: "Other/not sure" with 4%) | – |
| Marist College/NBC | Aug 31 – Sep 5, 2020 | 760 (LV) | ± 4.5% | 48% | 48% | - | - | 1% | 2% |
| Trafalgar Group | Sep 1–3, 2020 | 1,022 (LV) | ± 3.0% | 49% | 46% | 2% | - | 1% (Note: "Another Party Candidate" with 1%) | 2% |
| Redfield & Wilton Strategies | Aug 30 – Sep 3, 2020 | 1,093 (LV) | ± 2.96% | 43% | 48% | 1% | 1% | 1% | 6% |
| GQR Research (D) | Aug 26 – Sep 3, 2020 | 800 (LV) | ± 3.5% | 46% | 51% | - | - | – | – |
| Quinnipiac | Aug 28 – Sep 1, 2020 | 1,235 (LV) | ± 2.8% | 45% | 48% | - | - | 1% | 5% |
| SurveyMonkey/Axios | Aug 1–31, 2020 | 12,286 (LV) | – | 50% | 48% | - | - | – | 2% |
| Morning Consult | Aug 21–30, 2020 | 3,790 (LV) | ± (2%–4%) | 47% | 49% | - | - | – | – |
| Opinium/The Guardian | Aug 21–26, 2020 | 684 (LV) | – | 43% | 50% | - | - | 1% | 6% |
| Change Research/CNBC | Aug 21–23, 2020 | 1,262 (LV) | – | 46% | 49% | - | - | – | – |
| PPP | Aug 21–22, 2020 | 671 (V) | ± 3.8% | 44% | 48% | - | - | – | 7% |
| Redfield and Wilton Strategies | Aug 16, 2020 | 1,280 (LV) | – | 41% | 49% | 1% | - | 1% | 7% |
| Morning Consult | Aug 7–16, 2020 | 3,484 (LV) | ± (2%–4%) | 45% | 50% | - | - | – | – |
| Tyson Group/Consumer Energy Alliance (Note: The Consumer Energy Alliance is a pro-Keystone XL lobbying group) | Aug 11–15, 2020 | 750 (LV) | ± 4% | 44% | 46% | 2% | - | 1% (Note: "Refused" with 1%) | 6% |
| Change Research/CNBC | Aug 7–9, 2020 | 469 (LV) | – | 44% | 50% | - | - | – | – |
| OnMessage Inc./Heritage Action (Note: Heritage Action is the sister organization of the Heritage Foundation, which exclusively endorses Republican candidates) | Aug 2–4, 2020 | 400 (LV) | – | 49% | 49% | - | - | – | 2% |
| SurveyMonkey/Axios | Jul 1–31, 2020 | 13,945 (LV) | – | 48% | 49% | - | - | – | 2% |
| Change Research/CNBC | Jul 24–26, 2020 | 685 (LV) | – | 45% | 48% | - | - | – | – |
| Morning Consult | Jul 17–26, 2020 | 3,760 (LV) | ± 1.6% | 46% | 49% | - | - | – | – |
| Morning Consult | Jul 16–25, 2020 | – (LV) | – | 45% | 49% | - | - | – | – |
| CNN/SSRS | Jul 18–24, 2020 | 880 (RV) | ± 3.8% | 46% | 51% | - | - | 2% (Note: "Other" and "Neither" 1%) | 2% |
| Zogby Analytics | Jul 21–23, 2020 | 811 (RV) | ± 3.4% | 43% | 43% | 3% | 2% | – | 9% |
| Mason-Dixon | Jul 20–23, 2020 | 625 (LV) | ± 4.0% | 46% | 50% | - | - | – | 4% |
| Redfield & Wilton Strategies | Jul 19–21, 2020 | 1,121 (LV) | – | 41% | 48% | 1% | 1% | 1% | 8% |
| Quinnipiac University | Jul 16–20, 2020 | 924 (RV) | ± 4.3% | 38% | 51% | - | - | 6% (Note: "Someone else" with 4%; would not vote with 2%) | 5% |
| Morning Consult | Jul 6–15, 2020 | – (LV) | – | 45% | 50% | - | - | – | – |
| Florida Politics/AARP Florida/St. Pete Polls | Jul 13–14, 2020 | 3,018 (RV) | ± 1.8% | 44% | 50% | - | - | 2% (Note: "Third-party candidate" with 2%) | 3% |
| Gravis Marketing | Jul 13, 2020 | 513 (LV) | ± 4.3% | 43% | 53% | - | - | – | 4% |
| Change Research/CNBC | Jul 10–12, 2020 | 1,128 (LV) | – | 43% | 50% | - | - | – | – |
| YouGov/CBS | Jul 7–10, 2020 | 1,206 (LV) | ± 3.6% | 42% | 48% | - | - | 2% (Note: "Someone else/third party" with 2%; would not vote with 0%) | 8% |
| Morning Consult | Jun 26 – Jul 5, 2020 | – (LV) | – | 46% | 49% | - | - | – | – |
| Trafalgar Group | Jun 29 – Jul 2, 2020 | 1,072 (LV) | ± 2.91% | 46% | 46% | - | - | 5% (Note: "Other party candidate" with 5%) | 3% |
| SurveyMonkey/Axios | Jun 8–30, 2020 | 5,663 (LV) | – | 51% | 47% | - | - | – | 2% |
| Change Research/CNBC | Jun 26–28, 2020 | 951 (LV) | – | 45% | 50% | - | - | – | – |
| Morning Consult | Jun 16–25, 2020 | – (LV) | – | 45% | 49% | - | - | – | – |
| Fox News | Jun 20–23, 2020 | 1,010 (RV) | ± 3% | 40% | 49% | - | - | 6% (Note: "Other" with 4%; would not vote with 2%) | 6% |
| Siena College/NYT Upshot | Jun 8–18, 2020 | 651 (RV) | ± 4.6% | 41% | 47% | - | - | 4% (Note: "Another candidate" and would not vote with 2%) | 7% |
| Redfield & Wilton Strategies | Jun 14–15, 2020 | 1,079 (LV) | ± 2.98% | 41% | 45% | 1% | 1% | 1% | 11% |
| Morning Consult | Jun 6–15, 2020 | – (LV) | – | 45% | 50% | - | - | – | – |
| Change Research/CNBC | Jun 12–14, 2020 | 713 (LV) | – | 43% | 50% | - | - | 3% (Note: "Libertarian Party candidate/Green Party candidate" with 3%) | – |
| Gravis Marketing/OANN | Released Jun 11, 2020 | – (V) | – | 50% | 50% | - | - | – | – |
| TIPP/American Greatness PAC | Jun 9–11, 2020 | 875 (LV) | – | 40% | 51% | - | - | 4% (Note: "Other" with 3%; "prefer not to answer" with 1%) | 5% |
| Morning Consult | May 27 – Jun 5, 2020 | – (LV) | – | 48% | 47% | - | - | – | – |
| Change Research/CNBC | May 29–31, 2020 | 1,186 (LV) | – | 45% | 48% | - | - | 2% | 4% |
| Cygnal (R) | May 18–30, 2020 | 881 (LV) | ± 3.3% | 43.8% | 47% | - | - | 3.3% (Note: "Third party candidate" with 3.3%) | 5.9% |
| St. Pete Polls | May 26–27, 2020 | 4,763 (RV) | ± 1.4% | 46.7% | 47.5% | - | - | 2.7% (Note: "Third party" with 2.7%) | 3.1% |
| Morning Consult | May 17–26, 2020 | 3,593 (LV) | – | 48% | 47% | - | - | – | – |
| Morning Consult | May 16–25, 2020 | – (LV) | – | 48% | 47% | - | - | – | – |
| Point Blank Political | May 14–17, 2020 | 2,149 (LV) | ± 3.5% | 44% | 45% | 1% (Note: "Libertarian nominee" with 1.2%) | <1% (Note: "Green nominee" with 0.4%) | 2% | 8% |
| Point Blank Political | May 14–17, 2020 | 2,149 (LV) | ± 3.5% | 48% | 52% | - | - | – | – |
| Morning Consult | May 6–15, 2020 | – (LV) | – | 50% | 45% | - | - | – | – |
| Redfield & Wilton Strategies | May 10–14, 2020 | 1,014 (LV) | ± 3.1% | 43% | 45% | - | - | 3% (Note: "Third party/write-in" with 3%) | 10% |
| Florida Atlantic University | May 8–12, 2020 | 928 (RV) | ± 3.1% | 47% | 53% | - | - | – | – |
| Fox News | Apr 18–21, 2020 | 1,004 (RV) | ± 3.0% | 43% | 46% | - | - | 3% | 7% |
| Quinnipiac University | Apr 16–20, 2020 | 1,385 (RV) | ± 2.6% | 42% | 46% | - | - | 3% | 7% |
| St. Pete Polls | Apr 16–17, 2020 | 5,659 (RV) | ± 1.3% | 48% | 48% | - | - | – | 4% |
| University of North Florida | Mar 31 – Apr 4, 2020 | 3,244 (RV) | ± 1.7% | 40% | 46% | - | - | – | 8% |
| AtlasIntel | Mar 14–16, 2020 | 1,100 (RV) | ± 3.0% | 45% | 45% | - | - | 10% | – |
| Univision | Mar 6–12, 2020 | 1,071 (RV) | ± 3.0% | 48% | 45% | - | - | – | 7% |
| Florida Atlantic University | Mar 5–7, 2020 | 1,216 (RV) | ± 2.7% | 51% | 49% | - | - | – | – |
| University of North Florida | Feb, 2020 | 696 (LV) | – | 45% | 45% | - | - | – | 10% |
| Saint Leo University | Feb 17–22, 2020 | 900 (LV) | ± 3.5% | 40% | 51% | - | - | – | 8% |
| University of North Florida | Feb 10–18, 2020 | 668 (RV) | – | 48% | 49% | - | - | – | 3% |
| Florida Atlantic University | Jan 9–12, 2020 | 1,285 (RV) | ± 2.6% | 49% | 51% | - | - | – | – |
| Cherry Communications/Florida Chamber of Commerce (Note: Poll sponsored by the Florida Chamber of Commerce PAC) | Jan 3–12, 2020 | 608 (LV) | ± 4% | 49% | 45% | - | - | – | – |
| Mason-Dixon | Dec 11–16, 2019 | 625 (RV) | ± 4.0% | 45% | 47% | - | - | – | 8% |
| Siena College/NYT Upshot | Oct 13–26, 2019 | 650 (LV) | ± 4.4% | 44% | 46% | - | - | – | – |
| University of North Florida | Oct 14–20, 2019 | 643 (RV) | ± 3.8% | 43% | 48% | - | - | 6% (Note: Would not vote with 6%) | 3% |
| Florida Atlantic University | Sep 12–15, 2019 | 934 (RV) | ± 3.1% | 50.5% | 49.5% | - | - | – | – |
| Quinnipiac University | Jun 12–17, 2019 | 1,279 (RV) | ± 3.3% | 41% | 50% | - | - | 1% | 6% |
| St. Pete Polls | Jun 15–16, 2019 | 3,095 (LV) | ± 1.8% | 47% | 47% | - | - | – | 6% |
| Florida Atlantic University | May 16–19, 2019 | 1,007 (RV) | ± 3.0% | 50% | 50% | - | - | – | – |
| WPA Intelligence | Apr 27–30, 2019 | 200 (LV) | ± 6.9% | 48% | 44% | - | - | – | 7% |

Former candidates

Donald Trump vs. Michael Bloomberg

| Poll source | Date(s) administered | Sample size | Margin of error | Donald Trump (R) | Michael Bloomberg (D) | Other | Undecided |
|---|---|---|---|---|---|---|---|
| Saint Leo University | Feb 17–22, 2020 | 900 (LV) | ± 3.5% | 36% | 52% | – | 12% |
| University of North Florida | Feb 10–18, 2020 | 672 (RV) | – | 44% | 50% | – | 6% |
| Cherry Communications/Florida Chamber of Commerce | Jan 3–12, 2020 | 608 (LV) | ± 4% | 49% | 44% | – | – |

Donald Trump vs. Pete Buttigieg

| Poll source | Date(s) administered | Sample size | Margin of error | Donald Trump (R) | Pete Buttigieg (D) | Other | Undecided |
|---|---|---|---|---|---|---|---|
| Saint Leo University | Feb 17–22, 2020 | 900 (LV) | ± 3.5% | 40% | 45% | – | 15% |
| University of North Florida | Feb 10–18, 2020 | 664 (RV) | – | 49% | 45% | – | 7% |
| Florida Atlantic University | Jan 9–12, 2020 | 1,285 (RV) | ± 2.6% | 50% | 50% | – | – |
| Cherry Communications/Florida Chamber of Commerce | Jan 3–12, 2020 | 608 (LV) | ± 4% | 50% | 43% | – | – |
| Mason-Dixon | Dec 11–16, 2019 | 625 (RV) | ± 4.0% | 49% | 45% | – | 6% |
| University of North Florida | Oct 14–20, 2019 | 643 (RV) | ± 3.8% | 43% | 42% | 7% (Note: Would not vote with 7%) | 9% |
| Quinnipiac University | Jun 12–17, 2019 | 1,279 (RV) | ± 3.3% | 43% | 44% | 1% | 9% |
| Florida Atlantic University | May 16–19, 2019 | 1,007 (RV) | ± 3.0% | 52% | 48% | – | – |

Donald Trump vs. Kamala Harris

| Poll source | Date(s) administered | Sample size | Margin of error | Donald Trump (R) | Kamala Harris (D) | Other | Undecided |
|---|---|---|---|---|---|---|---|
| University of North Florida | Oct 14–20, 2019 | 643 (RV) | ± 3.8% | 44% | 41% | 8% (Note: Would not vote with 8%) | 7% |
| Florida Atlantic University | Sep 12–15, 2019 | 934 (RV) | ± 3.1% | 52% | 48% | – | – |
| Quinnipiac University | Jun 12–17, 2019 | 1,279 (RV) | ± 3.3% | 44% | 45% | 1% | 7% |
| Florida Atlantic University | May 16–19, 2019 | 1,007 (RV) | ± 3.0% | 53% | 47% | – | – |

Donald Trump vs. Amy Klobuchar

| Poll source | Date(s) administered | Sample size | Margin of error | Donald Trump (R) | Amy Klobuchar (D) | Other | Undecided |
|---|---|---|---|---|---|---|---|
| Saint Leo University | Feb 17–22, 2020 | 900 (LV) | ± 3.5% | 41% | 43% | – | 16% |
| University of North Florida | Feb 10–18, 2020 | 662 (RV) | – | 48% | 44% | – | 8% |

Donald Trump vs. Beto O'Rourke

| Poll source | Date(s) administered | Sample size | Margin of error | Donald Trump (R) | Beto O'Rourke (D) | Other | Undecided |
|---|---|---|---|---|---|---|---|
| Quinnipiac University | Jun 12–17, 2019 | 1,279 (RV) | ± 3.3% | 44% | 45% | 1% | 7% |

Donald Trump vs. Bernie Sanders

| Poll source | Date(s) administered | Sample size | Margin of error | Donald Trump (R) | Bernie Sanders (D) | Other | Undecided |
|---|---|---|---|---|---|---|---|
| AtlasIntel | Mar 14–16, 2020 | 1,100 (RV) | ± 3.0% | 48% | 41% | 11% | – |
| Univision | Mar 6–12, 2020 | 1,071 (RV) | ± 3.0% | 49% | 42% | – | 8% |
| Florida Atlantic University | Mar 5–7, 2020 | 1,216 (LV) | ± 2.7% | 53% | 47% | – | – |
| Saint Leo University | Feb 17–22, 2020 | 900 (LV) | ± 3.5% | 40% | 49% | – | 11% |
| University of North Florida | Feb 10–18, 2020 | 671 (RV) | – | 48% | 48% | – | 4% |
| Florida Atlantic University | Jan 9–12, 2020 | 1,285 (RV) | ± 2.6% | 47% | 53% | – | – |
| Mason-Dixon | Dec 11–16, 2019 | 625 (RV) | ± 4.0% | 49% | 44% | – | 7% |
| Siena College/NYT Upshot | Oct 13–26, 2019 | 650 (LV) | ± 4.4% | 45% | 44% | – | – |
| Florida Atlantic University | Sep 12–15, 2019 | 934 (RV) | ± 3.1% | 50.5% | 49.5% | – | – |
| Quinnipiac University | Jun 12–17, 2019 | 1,279 (RV) | ± 3.3% | 42% | 48% | 1% | 6% |
| Florida Atlantic University | May 16–19, 2019 | 1,007 (RV) | ± 3.0% | 51% | 49% | – | – |

Donald Trump vs. Elizabeth Warren

| Poll source | Date(s) administered | Sample size | Margin of error | Donald Trump (R) | Elizabeth Warren (D) | Other | Undecided |
|---|---|---|---|---|---|---|---|
| Saint Leo University | Feb 17–22, 2020 | 900 (LV) | ± 3.5% | 42% | 44% | – | 14% |
| University of North Florida | Feb 10–18, 2020 | 661 (RV) | – | 47% | 47% | – | 6% |
| Florida Atlantic University | Jan 9–12, 2020 | 1,285 (RV) | ± 2.6% | 49% | 51% | – | – |
| Cherry Communications/Florida Chamber of Commerce | Jan 3–12, 2020 | 608 (LV) | ± 4% | 50% | 43% | – | – |
| Mason-Dixon | Dec 11–16, 2019 | 625 (RV) | ± 4.0% | 51% | 42% | – | 7% |
| Siena College/NYT Upshot | Oct 13–26, 2019 | 650 (LV) | ± 4.4% | 46% | 42% | – | – |
| University of North Florida | Oct 14–20, 2019 | 643 (RV) | ± 3.8% | 43% | 46% | 6% | 6% |
| Florida Atlantic University | Sep 12–15, 2019 | 934 (RV) | ± 3.1% | 50% | 50% | – | – |
| Quinnipiac University | Jun 12–17, 2019 | 1,279 (RV) | ± 3.3% | 43% | 47% | 1% | 6% |
| Florida Atlantic University | May 16–19, 2019 | 1,007 (RV) | ± 3.0% | 52% | 48% | – | – |
| Zogby Analytics | Aug 17–23, 2017 | 828 (LV) | ± 3.4% | 39% | 48% | – | 14% |

Hypothetical polling

with Donald Trump and Oprah Winfrey

| Poll source | Date(s) administered | Sample size | Margin of error | Donald Trump (R) | Oprah Winfrey (D) | Other | Undecided |
|---|---|---|---|---|---|---|---|
| Dixie Strategies | Jan 9–10, 2018 | 785 (LV) | ± 3.5% | 48% | 24% | 15% | 13% |

with Donald Trump and generic Democrat

| Poll source | Date(s) administered | Sample size | Margin of error | Donald Trump (R) | Generic Democrat | Undecided |
|---|---|---|---|---|---|---|
| Public Policy Polling (D) (Note: Poll sponsored by the League of Conservation Voters) | Jun 14–16, 2019 | 679 (V) | ± 3.8% | 44% | 51% | 6% |
| Mason-Dixon | Jan 14–17, 2019 | 625 (RV) | ± 4.0% | 45% | 46% | 9% |

with Donald Trump and generic Opponent

| Poll source | Date(s) administered | Sample size | Margin of error | Donald Trump (R) | Generic Opponent | Undecided |
|---|---|---|---|---|---|---|
| Quinnipiac University | Mar 6–11, 2019 | 1,058 (V) | ± 3.7% | 31% | 51% (Note: "Would definitely not vote for Trump" with 51%) | 18% (Note: "Consider voting for Trump" with 14%; "don't know/no answer" with 4%) |

with Mike Pence and Joe Biden

| Poll source | Date(s) administered | Sample size | Margin of error | Mike Pence (R) | Joe Biden (D) | Other | Undecided |
|---|---|---|---|---|---|---|---|
| University of North Florida | Oct 14–20, 2019 | 643 (RV) | ± 3.8% | 39% | 49% | 8% | 5% |

with Mike Pence and Kamala Harris

| Poll source | Date(s) administered | Sample size | Margin of error | Mike Pence (R) | Kamala Harris (D) | Undecided |
|---|---|---|---|---|---|---|
| St. Leo University | Sep 27 – Oct 2, 2020 | 489 (LV) | ± 3.0% | 46.8% | 46.7% | 6.5% |

with Mike Pence and Elizabeth Warren

| Poll source | Date(s) administered | Sample size | Margin of error | Mike Pence (R) | Elizabeth Warren (D) | Other | Undecided |
|---|---|---|---|---|---|---|---|
| University of North Florida | Oct 14–20, 2019 | 643 (RV) | ± 3.8% | 40% | 46% | 8% | 6% |

=== Results ===
2020 United States presidential election in Florida
| Party | Candidate | Votes | % | ±% |
|---|---|---|---|---|
| Republican | Donald Trump Mike Pence | 5,668,731 | 51.22% | +2.20% |
| Democratic | Joe Biden Kamala Harris | 5,297,045 | 47.86% | +0.04% |
| Libertarian | Jo Jorgensen Spike Cohen | 70,324 | 0.64% | −1.56% |
| Green | Howie Hawkins Angela Walker | 14,721 | 0.13% | −0.55% |
| Reform | Rocky De La Fuente Darcy Richardson | 5,966 | 0.05% | −0.05% |
| Socialism and Liberation | Gloria La Riva Sunil Freeman | 5,712 | 0.05% | N/A |
| Constitution | Don Blankenship William Mohr | 3,902 | 0.04% | −0.13% |
| Write-in | | 1,055 | 0.01% | −0.26% |
| Total votes | | 11,067,456 | 100.00% | |

==== By county ====
| County | Donald Trump Republican | | Joe Biden Democratic | | Various candidates Other parties | | Margin | | Total votes cast |
| County | # | % | # | % | # | % | # | % | Total votes cast |
|---|---|---|---|---|---|---|---|---|---|
| Alachua | 50,972 | 35.74% | 89,704 | 62.90% | 1,928 | 1.35% | -38,732 | -27.16% | 142,604 |
| Baker | 11,911 | 84.58% | 2,037 | 14.47% | 134 | 0.95% | 9,874 | 70.11% | 14,082 |
| Bay | 66,097 | 70.91% | 25,614 | 27.48% | 1,502 | 1.61% | 40,483 | 43.43% | 93,213 |
| Bradford | 10,334 | 75.81% | 3,160 | 23.18% | 138 | 1.01% | 7,174 | 52.63% | 13,632 |
| Brevard | 207,883 | 57.62% | 148,549 | 41.18% | 4,332 | 1.20% | 59,334 | 16.44% | 360,764 |
| Broward | 333,409 | 34.81% | 618,752 | 64.61% | 5,511 | 0.58% | -285,343 | -29.80% | 957,672 |
| Calhoun | 5,274 | 80.82% | 1,209 | 18.53% | 43 | 0.66% | 4,065 | 62.29% | 6,526 |
| Charlotte | 73,243 | 62.96% | 42,273 | 36.34% | 824 | 0.71% | 30,970 | 26.62% | 116,340 |
| Citrus | 65,352 | 70.11% | 27,092 | 29.07% | 764 | 0.82% | 38,260 | 41.04% | 93,208 |
| Clay | 84,480 | 67.91% | 38,317 | 30.80% | 1,608 | 1.29% | 46,163 | 37.11% | 124,405 |
| Collier | 128,950 | 62.05% | 77,621 | 37.35% | 1,247 | 0.60% | 51,329 | 24.70% | 207,818 |
| Columbia | 23,836 | 72.14% | 8,914 | 26.98% | 292 | 0.88% | 14,822 | 45.16% | 33,042 |
| DeSoto | 8,313 | 65.67% | 4,259 | 33.64% | 87 | 0.69% | 4,054 | 32.03% | 12,659 |
| Dixie | 6,759 | 82.76% | 1,365 | 16.71% | 43 | 0.53% | 5,394 | 66.05% | 8,167 |
| Duval | 233,762 | 47.43% | 252,556 | 51.25% | 6,502 | 1.32% | -18,794 | -3.82% | 492,820 |
| Escambia | 96,674 | 56.74% | 70,929 | 41.63% | 2,769 | 1.63% | 25,745 | 15.11% | 170,372 |
| Flagler | 43,043 | 60.02% | 28,161 | 39.27% | 512 | 0.71% | 14,882 | 20.75% | 71,716 |
| Franklin | 4,675 | 68.26% | 2,120 | 30.95% | 54 | 0.79% | 2,555 | 37.31% | 6,849 |
| Gadsden | 7,465 | 31.42% | 16,153 | 67.98% | 144 | 0.61% | -8,688 | -36.56% | 23,762 |
| Gilchrist | 7,895 | 81.52% | 1,700 | 17.55% | 90 | 0.93% | 6,195 | 63.97% | 9,685 |
| Glades | 3,782 | 72.83% | 1,385 | 26.67% | 26 | 0.50% | 2,397 | 46.16% | 5,193 |
| Gulf | 6,113 | 74.89% | 1,985 | 24.32% | 65 | 0.80% | 4,128 | 50.57% | 8,163 |
| Hamilton | 3,815 | 65.44% | 1,963 | 33.67% | 52 | 0.89% | 1,852 | 31.77% | 5,830 |
| Hardee | 6,122 | 72.15% | 2,298 | 27.08% | 65 | 0.77% | 3,824 | 45.07% | 8,485 |
| Hendry | 7,906 | 61.10% | 4,929 | 38.09% | 105 | 0.81% | 2,977 | 23.01% | 12,940 |
| Hernando | 70,412 | 64.64% | 37,519 | 34.45% | 991 | 0.91% | 32,893 | 30.19% | 108,922 |
| Highlands | 34,873 | 66.85% | 16,938 | 32.47% | 359 | 0.69% | 17,935 | 34.38% | 52,170 |
| Hillsborough | 327,398 | 45.98% | 376,367 | 52.86% | 8,298 | 1.17% | -48,969 | -6.88% | 712,063 |
| Holmes | 8,080 | 89.10% | 924 | 10.19% | 64 | 0.71% | 7,156 | 78.91% | 9,068 |
| Indian River | 58,872 | 60.39% | 37,844 | 38.82% | 768 | 0.79% | 21,028 | 21.57% | 97,484 |
| Jackson | 15,488 | 69.08% | 6,766 | 30.18% | 165 | 0.74% | 8,722 | 38.90% | 22,419 |
| Jefferson | 4,479 | 53.00% | 3,897 | 46.11% | 75 | 0.89% | 582 | 6.89% | 8,451 |
| Lafayette | 3,128 | 85.51% | 510 | 13.94% | 20 | 0.55% | 2,618 | 71.57% | 3,658 |
| Lake | 125,859 | 59.56% | 83,505 | 39.52% | 1,950 | 0.92% | 42,354 | 20.04% | 211,314 |
| Lee | 233,247 | 59.21% | 157,695 | 40.03% | 2,957 | 0.75% | 75,552 | 19.18% | 393,899 |
| Leon | 57,453 | 35.26% | 103,517 | 63.54% | 1,959 | 1.20% | -46,064 | -28.28% | 162,929 |
| Levy | 16,749 | 72.37% | 6,205 | 26.81% | 191 | 0.83% | 10,544 | 45.56% | 23,145 |
| Liberty | 2,846 | 79.92% | 694 | 19.49% | 21 | 0.59% | 2,152 | 60.43% | 3,561 |
| Madison | 5,576 | 59.45% | 3,747 | 39.95% | 57 | 0.61% | 1,829 | 19.50% | 9,380 |
| Manatee | 124,987 | 57.61% | 90,166 | 41.56% | 1,805 | 0.83% | 34,821 | 16.05% | 216,958 |
| Marion | 127,826 | 62.54% | 74,858 | 36.63% | 1,692 | 0.83% | 52,968 | 25.91% | 204,376 |
| Martin | 61,168 | 61.96% | 36,893 | 37.37% | 665 | 0.67% | 24,275 | 24.59% | 98,726 |
| Miami-Dade | 532,833 | 46.06% | 617,864 | 53.41% | 6,119 | 0.53% | -85,031 | -7.35% | 1,156,816 |
| Monroe | 25,693 | 53.49% | 21,881 | 45.56% | 455 | 0.95% | 3,812 | 7.93% | 48,029 |
| Nassau | 42,566 | 72.38% | 15,564 | 26.46% | 681 | 1.16% | 27,002 | 45.92% | 58,811 |
| Okaloosa | 79,798 | 68.57% | 34,248 | 29.43% | 2,327 | 2.00% | 45,550 | 39.14% | 116,373 |
| Okeechobee | 11,470 | 71.90% | 4,390 | 27.52% | 94 | 0.59% | 7,080 | 44.38% | 15,954 |
| Orange | 245,398 | 37.90% | 395,014 | 61.02% | 6,991 | 1.08% | -149,616 | -23.12% | 647,403 |
| Osceola | 73,480 | 42.61% | 97,297 | 56.43% | 1,659 | 0.96% | -23,817 | -13.82% | 172,436 |
| Palm Beach | 334,711 | 43.29% | 433,572 | 56.08% | 4,875 | 0.63% | -98,861 | -12.79% | 773,158 |
| Pasco | 179,621 | 59.48% | 119,073 | 39.43% | 3,276 | 1.09% | 60,548 | 20.05% | 301,970 |
| Pinellas | 276,209 | 49.35% | 277,450 | 49.57% | 6,056 | 1.08% | -1,241 | -0.22% | 559,715 |
| Polk | 194,586 | 56.69% | 145,049 | 42.26% | 3,621 | 1.05% | 49,537 | 14.43% | 343,256 |
| Putnam | 25,514 | 70.15% | 10,527 | 28.94% | 332 | 0.91% | 14,987 | 41.21% | 36,373 |
| Santa Rosa | 77,385 | 72.37% | 27,612 | 25.82% | 1,931 | 1.81% | 49,773 | 46.55% | 106,928 |
| Sarasota | 148,370 | 54.84% | 120,110 | 44.39% | 2,095 | 0.77% | 28,260 | 10.45% | 270,575 |
| Seminole | 125,241 | 48.02% | 132,528 | 50.81% | 3,046 | 1.17% | -7,287 | -2.79% | 260,815 |
| St. Johns | 110,946 | 62.82% | 63,850 | 36.15% | 1,826 | 1.03% | 47,096 | 26.67% | 176,622 |
| St. Lucie | 86,831 | 50.43% | 84,137 | 48.87% | 1,201 | 0.70% | 2,694 | 1.56% | 172,169 |
| Sumter | 62,761 | 67.86% | 29,341 | 31.72% | 383 | 0.41% | 33,420 | 36.14% | 92,485 |
| Suwannee | 16,410 | 77.93% | 4,485 | 21.30% | 162 | 0.77% | 11,925 | 56.63% | 21,057 |
| Taylor | 7,751 | 76.54% | 2,299 | 22.70% | 77 | 0.76% | 5,452 | 53.84% | 10,127 |
| Union | 5,133 | 82.20% | 1,053 | 16.86% | 59 | 0.94% | 4,080 | 65.34% | 6,245 |
| Volusia | 173,821 | 56.54% | 130,575 | 42.47% | 3,043 | 0.99% | 43,246 | 14.07% | 307,439 |
| Wakulla | 12,874 | 69.95% | 5,351 | 29.08% | 179 | 0.97% | 7,523 | 40.87% | 18,404 |
| Walton | 32,947 | 75.37% | 10,338 | 23.65% | 426 | 0.97% | 22,609 | 51.72% | 43,711 |
| Washington | 9,876 | 80.12% | 2,347 | 19.04% | 104 | 0.84% | 7,529 | 61.08% | 12,327 |
| Totals | 5,668,731 | 51.22% | 5,297,045 | 47.86% | 101,680 | 0.92% | 371,686 | 3.36% | 11,067,456 |

Counties that flipped from Republican to Democratic

- Duval (largest municipality: Jacksonville)
- Pinellas (largest municipality: St. Petersburg)
- Seminole (largest municipality: Sanford)

==== By congressional district ====
Trump won 15 of 27 congressional districts, while Biden won 12, including one that elected a Republican.

| District | Trump | Biden | Representative |
|---|---|---|---|
| 1st | 65.9% | 32.4% | Matt Gaetz |
| 2nd | 67% | 32% | Neal Dunn |
| 3rd | 56% | 42.8% | Ted Yoho |
| 3rd | 56% | 42.8% | Kat Cammack |
| 4th | 59.9% | 38.9% | John Rutherford |
| 5th | 36.2% | 62.7% | Al Lawson |
| 6th | 58.3% | 40.8% | Michael Waltz |
| 7th | 44.2% | 54.6% | Stephanie Murphy |
| 8th | 58.3% | 40.6% | Bill Posey |
| 9th | 46% | 52.9% | Darren Soto |
| 10th | 37% | 62% | Val Demings |
| 11th | 65.4% | 33.8% | Daniel Webster |
| 12th | 57.9% | 41% | Gus Bilirakis |
| 13th | 47.4% | 51.5% | Charlie Crist |
| 14th | 41.6% | 57.2% | Kathy Castor |
| 15th | 53.7% | 45.2% | Ross Spano |
| 15th | 53.7% | 45.2% | Scott Franklin |
| 16th | 53.6% | 45.5% | Vern Buchanan |
| 17th | 63.3% | 35.9% | Greg Steube |
| 18th | 53.9% | 45.5% | Brian Mast |
| 19th | 59.7% | 39.6% | Francis Rooney |
| 19th | 59.7% | 39.6% | Byron Donalds |
| 20th | 22.1% | 77.3% | Alcee Hastings |
| 21st | 41.2% | 58.2% | Lois Frankel |
| 22nd | 42.3% | 57.2% | Ted Deutch |
| 23rd | 41.2% | 58.3% | Debbie Wasserman Schultz |
| 24th | 24% | 75.4% | Frederica Wilson |
| 25th | 61.2% | 38.2% | Mario Díaz-Balart |
| 26th | 52.5% | 46.9% | Debbie Mucarsel-Powell |
| 26th | 52.5% | 46.9% | Carlos Giménez |
| 27th | 48.1% | 51.3% | Donna Shalala |
| 27th | 48.1% | 51.3% | Maria Elvira Salazar |

== Analysis ==
This election was the first time since 1992, and only the second time since 1960, that Florida went to the losing candidate in a presidential election. It was also the first time since 1960 that both Ohio and Florida have voted for the losing candidate in a presidential election, the first time since 1992 that Florida voted Republican while neighboring Georgia voted Democratic, and the first time since 1992 that Florida voted more Republican than North Carolina. Trump also became the first Republican candidate to win Florida with a majority of the state's popular vote since George W. Bush did so in 2004.

Despite his loss statewide, Biden became the first Democrat to win Duval County—consolidated with Jacksonville—since Southerner Jimmy Carter in 1976, and the first Democrat to win Seminole County since Harry Truman in 1948. Biden also flipped Pinellas County back to the Democratic Party. Biden became the first Democrat to win the presidency without carrying Jefferson County since Lyndon B. Johnson in 1964, and the first Democrat to win the presidency without carrying Monroe County since Grover Cleveland in 1884.

Florida was one of seven states where Trump received a higher percentage of the vote than he did in 2016. (Note: The other six states were Arkansas, California, Hawaii, Illinois, Nevada, and Utah, as well as Washington DC.) Florida is one of three states that voted twice for Barack Obama and thrice for Trump, the other two being Ohio and Iowa.

=== Ex-felons ===
The United States Court of Appeals for the 11th Circuit, located in Atlanta, ruled that ex-felons could not vote in Florida unless they pay fines and fees. Florida voters approved amendment 4 in November 2018, which restored voting for felons upon completion of all terms of sentence including parole or probation, except for those who committed murders or were involved in sex crimes. The Republican-controlled legislature then passed a law which required ex-felons to settle their financial obligation in courts. The United States District Court in Tallahassee ruled against it in May, but the circuit court overturned it in September, which was speculated to have created further problems for ex-felons when they voted in November. Civil rights organizations including American Civil Liberties Union opposed the decision by the court.

=== Miami-Dade County ===
In Miami-Dade County, the majority of Trump support came from the west and the majority of Biden support came from the east. Mexican, Haitian, and African American precincts tended to vote for Biden, while Cuban and Colombian American precincts did so for Trump. Trump won approximately two thirds of the vote in Hialeah, whereas it was nearly evenly split four years prior. Due to the heavy presence of the Cuban-American community, Hialeah traditionally, as of 2020, leaned towards Republican politics. Trump's coattails played a role in the election of Miami Republicans Carlos A. Giménez and Maria Elvira Salazar to the House of Representatives.

Residents of Cuban descent often had an antagonism against leftist movements due to associations with Fidel Castro. Trump sought to attract these voters by implementing anti-Cuba policies.

Additionally, Trump made efforts to target other Hispanic demographics. Trump significantly increased his share of the vote in majority-Hispanic Osceola County, winning 42.53% of the vote, the highest since 2004.

=== Edison exit polls ===
2020 presidential election in Florida by demographic subgroup (Edison exit polling)
| Demographic subgroup | Biden | Trump | % of total vote |
|---|---|---|---|
| Total vote | 47.86 | 51.22 | 100 |
Ideology
| Liberals | 83 | 16 | 19 |
| Moderates | 59 | 40 | 42 |
| Conservatives | 16 | 83 | 39 |
Party
| Democrats | 94 | 5 | 30 |
| Republicans | 7 | 93 | 38 |
| Independents | 54 | 43 | 32 |
Gender
| Men | 45 | 54 | 45 |
| Women | 51 | 48 | 55 |
Race/ethnicity
| White | 37 | 62 | 62 |
| Black | 89 | 10 | 14 |
| Latino | 53 | 46 | 19 |
| Asian | – | – | 1 |
| Other | 55 | 44 | 3 |
Age
| 18–24 years old | 57 | 42 | 7 |
| 25–29 years old | 64 | 35 | 6 |
| 30–39 years old | 48 | 50 | 13 |
| 40–49 years old | 48 | 51 | 13 |
| 50–64 years old | 45 | 54 | 28 |
| 65 and older | 45 | 55 | 32 |
Sexual orientation
| LGBT | 83 | 15 | 6 |
| Not LGBT | 46 | 53 | 94 |
Education
| High school or less | 44 | 56 | 19 |
| Some college education | 50 | 49 | 25 |
| Associate degree | 45 | 53 | 20 |
| Bachelor's degree | 49 | 50 | 22 |
| Postgraduate degree | 53 | 45 | 14 |
Issue regarded as most important
| Racial inequality | 86 | 12 | 13 |
| Coronavirus | 88 | 10 | 18 |
| Economy | 13 | 87 | 38 |
| Crime and safety | 12 | 88 | 10 |
| Health care | 83 | 16 | 13 |
Region
| North/Panhandle | 41 | 58 | 18 |
| Orlando/Central Atlantic | 51 | 48 | 19 |
| Tampa Bay area | 48 | 51 | 16 |
| Gulf Coast/Mid-Florida | 39 | 60 | 20 |
| Miami/Gold Coast | 58 | 41 | 27 |
Area type
| Urban | 55 | 44 | 41 |
| Suburban | 44 | 55 | 50 |
| Rural | 38 | 61 | 9 |
Family's financial situation today
| Better than four years ago | 18 | 81 | 44 |
| Worse than four years ago | 84 | 15 | 19 |
| About the same | 67 | 32 | 36 |

== See also ==
- United States presidential elections in Florida
- 2020 United States presidential election
- 2020 Democratic Party presidential primaries
- 2020 Republican Party presidential primaries
- 2020 United States elections

== Notes ==
Partisan clients
