= Harry Enten =

American journalist (born 1988)

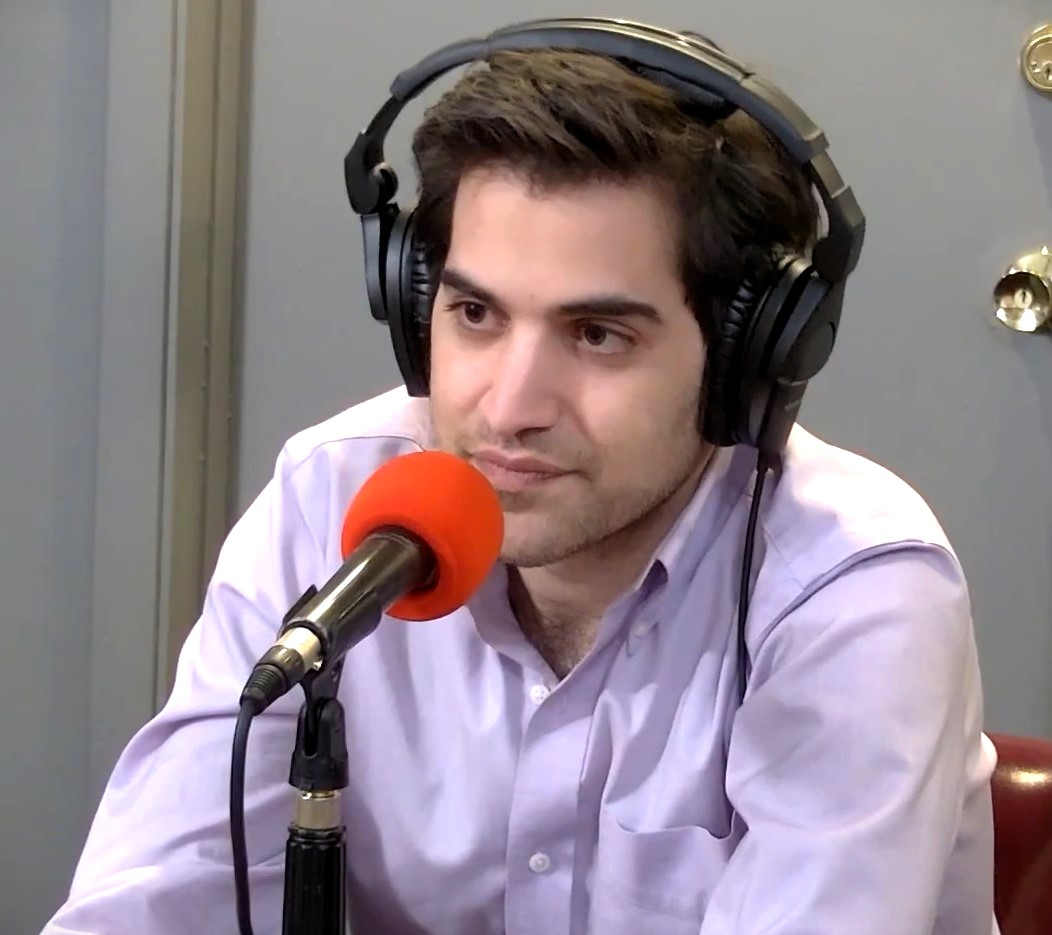
- Enten in 2020
- Born: Harry Joe Enten; March 1, 1988 (age 38); New York City, New York, U.S.
- Education: Dartmouth College (BA)
- Occupation: Journalist
- Employer: CNN
- Known for: Chief Data Analyst for CNN
- Relatives: Neil Sedaka (uncle)

Harry Joe Enten (born March 1, 1988) is an American journalist who is the Chief Data Analyst for CNN and host of CNN's Margins of Error podcast. He was previously a senior political writer and analyst for the website FiveThirtyEight. According to the Columbia Journalism Review, Enten is representative of a new generation of political journalists, focusing on data-driven journalism instead of reporting from the campaign trail.

== Early life and education ==
Enten was raised in a Jewish family in the Riverdale neighborhood of The Bronx, New York City. Enten was introduced to politics at the age of 4 when his father, a judge, took him into the polling booth to vote in the 1992 presidential election, followed by the 1993 New York City mayoral election and 1996 presidential election. He attended Riverdale Country School. He is the nephew of late singer-songwriter Neil Sedaka (1939-2026), who married Enten's aunt.

Enten graduated magna cum laude and Phi Beta Kappa from Dartmouth College in 2011, majoring in Government, which covers Politics, Economics, and Law. Enten chose to attend Dartmouth partially due to New Hampshire's status as the first-in-the-nation primary.

== Career ==
Enten began publishing a blog called Margin of Error, and held an internship at NBC News' political unit in Washington, D.C. Prior to working for FiveThirtyEight, Enten was a journalist for The Guardian.

=== FiveThirtyEight ===
Along with Carl Bialik and Walter Hickey, Enten was one of the first people Nate Silver hired when FiveThirtyEight relaunched under ESPN in 2013. Prior to joining FiveThirtyEight, Enten wrote for The Guardian. He mostly wrote articles on politics for FiveThirtyEight, but also occasionally wrote weather pieces. Enten was also one of the co-hosts of the FiveThirtyEight politics podcast, alongside Jody Avirgan, Nate Silver, and Clare Malone. He announced on February 5, 2018, that he was leaving FiveThirtyEight to join CNN's politics team as a senior political writer and analyst.

=== CNN ===
Enten joined CNN in February 2018 as a senior writer and analyst with a focus on polling, electoral trends and election forecasting. In 2019, CNN host Jake Tapper praised Enten following his arrival as "the kind of guy who makes us all smarter, focusing on things that most of us hadn’t even thought of." He hosted the podcast The Forecast Fest on CNN with Kate Bolduan and John Avlon covering the 2020 presidential election and the Margins of Error podcast, where he focuses on data-driven journalism. Enten was promoted to CNN's Chief Data Analyst in February 2025.

While presenting polling data on CNN, Enten has become recognized for his energetic presentation style and use of phrases such as "Holy Toledo!" or "Johnny B" to refer to co-host John Berman. In April 2025, Republican pollster Frank Luntz accused Enten on-air of being too theatrical in his presentation of polling on CNN. President Donald Trump frequently cites Enten's segments with positive poll numbers at rallies and in his Truth Social posts. While calling into CNBC's Squawk Box in August 2025, Trump referred to Enten as "Harry Emden" when pointing to a CNN segment as confirming his apparent high job approval numbers. Enten went on to explain on Laura Coates Live that he did not "expect that there would be that type of infatuation from the president of the United States". In October 2026, Trump played clips of Enten on CNN at his rallies where Enten was presenting polling that so-called "MAGA Republicans" held a positive view of Trump with rallygoers cheering at the clips. Enten said that Trump was playing those clips "because he believes it shows him to be popular" despite the polling only representing a portion of the electorate.

== Personal life ==
Enten is a lifelong Buffalo Bills fan.
