= Caswell Silver =

American geologist and oil entrepreneur

Caswell Silver (June 25, 1916 – October 18, 1988) was an American geologist and entrepreneur who was President of Sundance Oil Company from 1960 to 1984. In addition to the business of oil and gas exploration, he was active in the American Association of Petroleum Geologists and published original research on petroleum geology. He endowed the Caswell Silver Foundation at the University of New Mexico.

== Early life and education ==
Silver was born in New York City and grew up in Waterbury, Connecticut as the next to youngest of four brothers and a sister. After first enrolling at the University of Connecticut in 1934, for reasons of health he headed west and ultimately enrolled at the University of New Mexico in Albuquerque, where he earned his bachelor's degree in 1940 with a major in geology and mathematics.

He went to work for the US Geological Service, mapping silver mining districts in the San Juan Mountains of Colorado. He subsequently served as an assistant topographic and hydrographic engineer with the United States Coast and Geodetic Survey in Cape Fear, North Carolina.

== Military service in World War II ==
Silver joined the U.S. Navy in 1942 and served three years in the Photo Interpretation Branch of the Naval Intelligence in the South Pacific in Guadalcanal and Hawaii, attaining the rank of Lieutenant.

== 1945–1988 ==
After the War, Silver returned to the University of New Mexico, where he completed a master's degree in geology. "Silver always said that he chose a master's degree program in geology rather than in physics, which he also loved, because he liked to gamble".

Making his home in Albuquerque, Silver worked as a consultant in gas exploration and development, and eventually became an independent operator while also being a consultant on oil and gas exploration and precious metals mining.

Silver also conducted research, joined the American Association of Petroleum Geologists (AAPG), and became a fellow of the Geological Society of America. He published several scientific papers, and in 1952 co-authored a book with Vincent C. Kelley on “The Geology of the Caballo Mountains”. He helped to found the New Mexico Geological Society in 1947 and served as its president in 1957–58.

In 1959 Silver moved with his family to Denver, Colorado, where he had purchased a controlling interest in Sundance Oil Company, a Utah company. At the time, Sundance was earning small royalties and had no full-time employees. Over the next 24 years, serving as President of the company, Silver built Sundance into an independent oil and gas exploration company, discovering and developing fields in Colorado, Nebraska and, in 1971, Alberta, Canada. Over the years, the company's stock exchange listing moved from the Salt Lake Stock and Mining Exchange, to the Pacific Coast Stock Exchange, to the American Stock Exchange.

Silver continued to publish research and remained active in the AAPG and other professional associations. In 1980 he was a founding trustee of the Geological Society of America Foundation.

In June 1984, Silver resigned as President, Chief Executive Officer, and Chairman of the Board of Sundance. He sold all of his family's interests in the company.

== Caswell Silver Foundation ==
In 1980 Caswell and his wife Elizabeth established the Caswell Silver Foundation as a 501c3 endowment at the University of New Mexico. This Foundation is administered by the Department of Earth and Planetary Sciences, and supports visiting professorships, graduate fellowships, undergraduate research, and lectures by distinguished scholars.

== Selected publications ==
- Vincent C. Kelley and Caswell Silver. "Stages and epochs of mineralization in the San Juan Mountains, Colorado, as shown at the Dunmore Mine, Ouray County, Colorado," Economic Geology, March 1946, Vol. 41: 139-159.
- Caswell Silver, "Jurassic Overlap in Western New Mexico," AAPG Bulletin, January 1948, Vol. 32: 68-81.
- Caswell Silver. "Occurrence of Gas in Cretaceous Rocks of San Juan Basin," New Mexico Geological Society Guidebook, 1950.
- Vincent C. Kelley and Caswell Silver. Geology of the Caballo Mountains, with special reference to regional stratigraphy and structure and to mineral resources, including oil and gas. University of New Mexico Press: Albuquerque, 1952, 286 pages + 9 maps/sections in pocket.
- Caswell Silver. "Cretaceous Stratigraphy of the San Juan Basin", New Mexico Geological Society Guidebook, 1951.
- Caswell Silver. "Stratigraphic Possibility in the San Juan Basin", New Mexico Geological Society Guidebook, 1951.
- Parry Reiche, Vincent Cooper Kelley, Caswell Silver. Regional Tectonics of the Colorado Plateau and Relationship to the Origin and Distribution of Uranium, Prepared in Cooperation with U.S. Atomic Energy Commission, Division of Raw Materials, Volumes 2-5. 286 pages. University of New Mexico Press, 1952.
- Caswell Silver. "Manganese Deposits of the Mogollon Rim", Economic Geology, 1955.
- Caswell Silver. "Relation of Coastal and Submarine Topography to Cretaceous Stratigraphy", Four Corner Guidebook to San Juan Basin, 1957.
- Caswell Silver. "History and folklore of the San Juan region," pp. 222–234 in Southwestern San Juan Mountains (Colorado), Kottlowski, F. E.; Baldwin, B.; [eds.], New Mexico Geological Society, 8th Annual Fall Field Conference Guidebook, 258 pages.
- Caswell Silver. "Principles of Gas Occurrence, San Juan Basin", AAPG Memoir 9: Natural Gases of North America, 1968.
- Caswell Silver. "Entrapment of Petroleum in Isolated Porous Bodies", AAPG Bulletin [American Association of Petroleum Geologists], Vol. 57, No. 4, 1973: 726-740.
- Kam Chiang and Caswell Silver. "Abstract: Hoadley – A Potential Supergiant Gas Field in South-Central Alberta, Canada," AAPG Bulletin, Vol. 66, No. 7 (July), 1982.

== Honors ==
- Caswell Silver was awarded an honorary doctor of science degree (Sc.D.) from the University of New Mexico in 1981.
- In Silver's honor a mineral, Caswellsilverite (NaCrS_{2}), found in a meteorite that fell in Norton County, Kansas in 1948, was registered with the International Mineralogical Association in 1982.

== Personal life ==
Caswell married Elizabeth Silver (née Bauserman) on August 5, 1936, and they had two daughters, Anne Silver and Sue Silver Harivandi. Elizabeth Silver died in Santa Fe on July 3, 2009, at the age of 93.

Caswell Silver was a brother of Caltech geologist Leon Silver (who also served on the Caswell Silver Foundation board), and a great-uncle of statistician-journalist Nate Silver. Caswell Silver is buried in Santa Fe National Cemetery, Santa Fe, New Mexico.
