= Nate Silver =

American statistician and writer (born 1978)

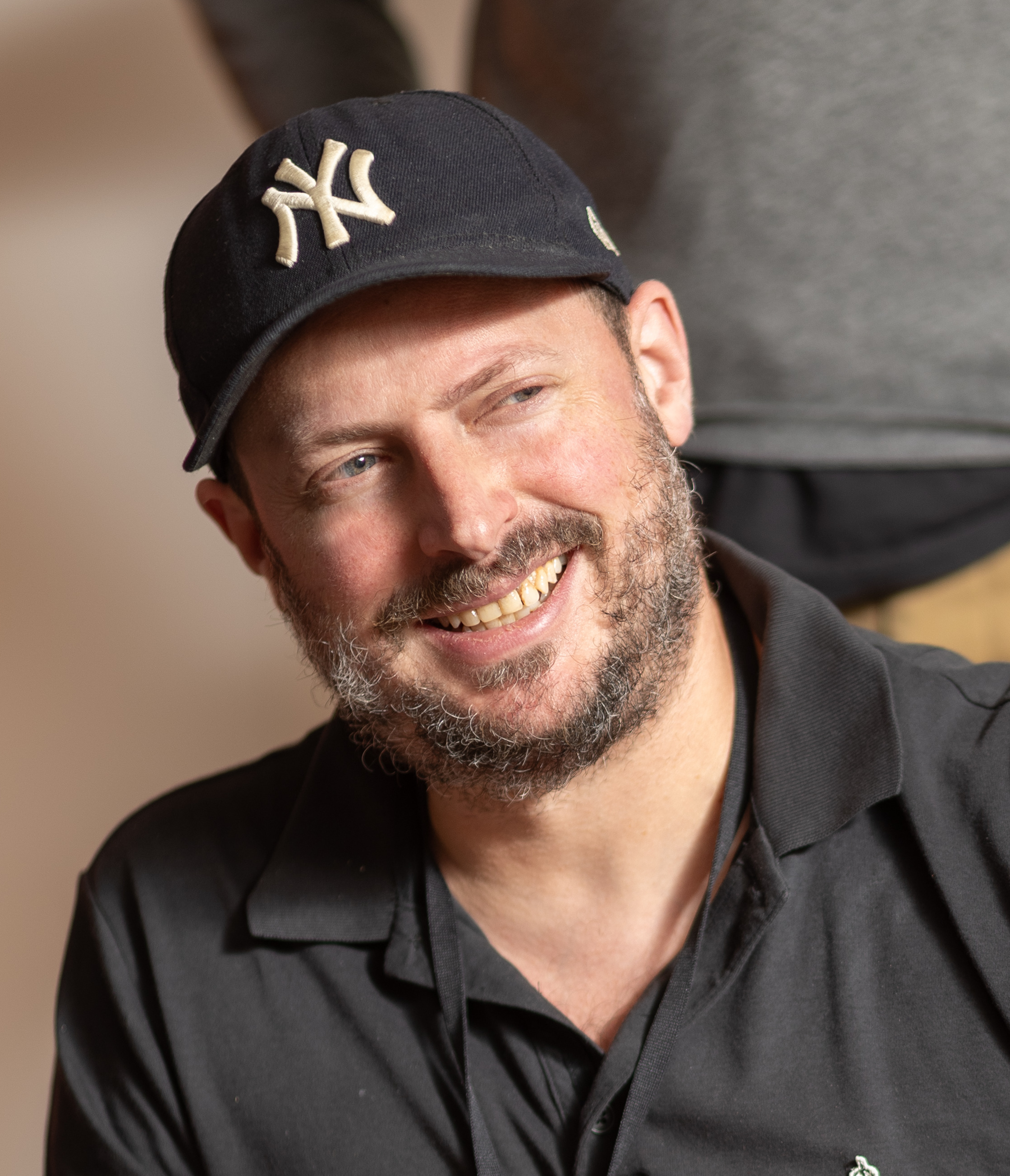
- Silver in 2023
- Born: Nathaniel Read Silver; January 13, 1978 (age 48); East Lansing, Michigan, U.S.
- Education: University of Chicago (BA)
- Occupations: Statistician, journalist
- Years active: 2000–present
- Known for: PECOTA, FiveThirtyEight, Silver Bulletin
- Website: natesilver.net

Nathaniel Read Silver (born January 13, 1978) is an American statistician, political analyst, author, sports gambler, and poker player who analyzes baseball, basketball, football, and elections. He is the founder of FiveThirtyEight and held the position of editor-in-chief there, along with being a special correspondent for ABC News until May 2023. Since departing FiveThirtyEight, Silver has been publishing in his online newsletter Silver Bulletin and serves as an advisor to Polymarket.

Silver was named one of the world's 100 most influential people by Time in 2009 after his election forecasting model correctly predicted the outcomes in 49 of 50 states in the 2008 U.S. presidential election. His subsequent models predicted the outcome of the 2012 and 2020 presidential elections with high accuracy. He gave Donald Trump, the eventual winner, a 28.6% chance of victory in the 2016 presidential election, a higher estimate than other major scientific forecasts.

Much of Silver's approach can be characterized by using statistical models to understand complex social systems such as professional sports, the popularity of political platforms and elections.

== Early life and education ==
Silver was born in East Lansing, Michigan, to Sally (née Thrun), a community activist, and Brian David Silver, a former chair of the political science department at Michigan State University. Silver's mother's family was of English and German descent. His maternal great-grandfather, Harmon Lewis, was president of the Alcoa Steamship Company, Inc. Silver's father's family includes two uncles, Leon Silver and Caswell Silver, who were distinguished geologists. Silver has described himself as "half-Jewish".

Silver showed a proficiency in math from a young age. According to journalist William Hageman, "Silver caught the baseball bug when he was 6.... It was 1984, the year the Detroit Tigers won the World Series. The Tigers became his team and baseball his sport. And if there's anything that goes hand in glove with baseball, it's numbers, another of Silver's childhood interests. ('It's always more interesting to apply it to batting averages than algebra class.')"

Silver first showed his journalism skills as a writer and opinion page editor for The Portrait, East Lansing High School's student newspaper, from 1993 to 1996. Silver won first place in the state of Michigan in the 49th John S. Knight Scholarship Contest for senior high school debaters in 1996.

In 2000, Silver graduated with honors with a Bachelor of Arts degree in economics from the University of Chicago. He also wrote for the South Side Weekly and The Chicago Maroon. He spent his third year at the London School of Economics.

== Early career: 2000–2008 ==
=== Economic consultant: 2000–2004 ===
After college graduation in 2000, Silver worked for three and a half years as a transfer pricing consultant with KPMG in Chicago. When asked in 2009, "What is your biggest regret in life?" Silver responded, "Spending four years of my life at a job I didn't like". While employed at KPMG, Silver continued to nurture his lifelong interest in baseball and statistics, and on the side he began to work on his PECOTA system for projecting player performance and careers. He quit his job at KPMG in April 2004 and for a time earned his living mainly by playing online poker. According to Sports Illustrated writer Alexander Wolff, over a three-year period Silver earned $400,000 from online poker.

=== Baseball analyst: 2003–2008 ===
In 2003, Silver became a writer for Baseball Prospectus (BP), after having sold PECOTA to BP in return for a partnership interest. After resigning from KPMG in 2004, he took the position of Executive Vice-president, later renamed Managing Partner of BP. Silver further developed PECOTA and wrote a weekly column under the heading "Lies, Damned Lies". He applied sabermetric techniques to a broad range of topics including forecasting the performance of individual players, the economics of baseball, metrics for the valuation of players, and developing an Elo rating system for Major League baseball.

Between 2003 and 2009, Silver co-authored the Baseball Prospectus annual book of Major League Baseball forecasts, as well as other books, including Mind Game: How the Boston Red Sox Got Smart, Won a World Series, and Created a New Blueprint for Winning, Baseball Between the Numbers, and It Ain't Over 'til It's Over: The Baseball Prospectus Pennant Race Book.

He contributed articles about baseball to ESPN.com, Sports Illustrated, Slate, the New York Sun, and The New York Times.

Silver wrote more than 200 articles for Baseball Prospectus.

==== PECOTA ====
PECOTA (Player Empirical Comparison and Optimization Test Algorithm) is a statistical system that projects the future performance of hitters and pitchers. It is designed primarily for two users: fans interested in fantasy baseball, and professionals in the baseball business trying to predict the performance and valuation of major league players. Unlike most other baseball projection systems, PECOTA relies on matching a given current player to a set of "comparable" players whose past performance can serve as a guide to how the given current player is likely to perform in the future. Unlike most other such systems, PECOTA also calculates a range of probable performance levels rather than a single predicted value on a given measure such as earned run average or batting average.

PECOTA projections were first published by Baseball Prospectus in the 2003 edition of its annual book as well as online by BaseballProspectus.com. Silver produced the PECOTA forecasts for each Major League Baseball season from 2003 through 2009.

== FiveThirtyEight: 2008–2023 ==
=== FiveThirtyEight blog ===
==== Creation and motivation ====
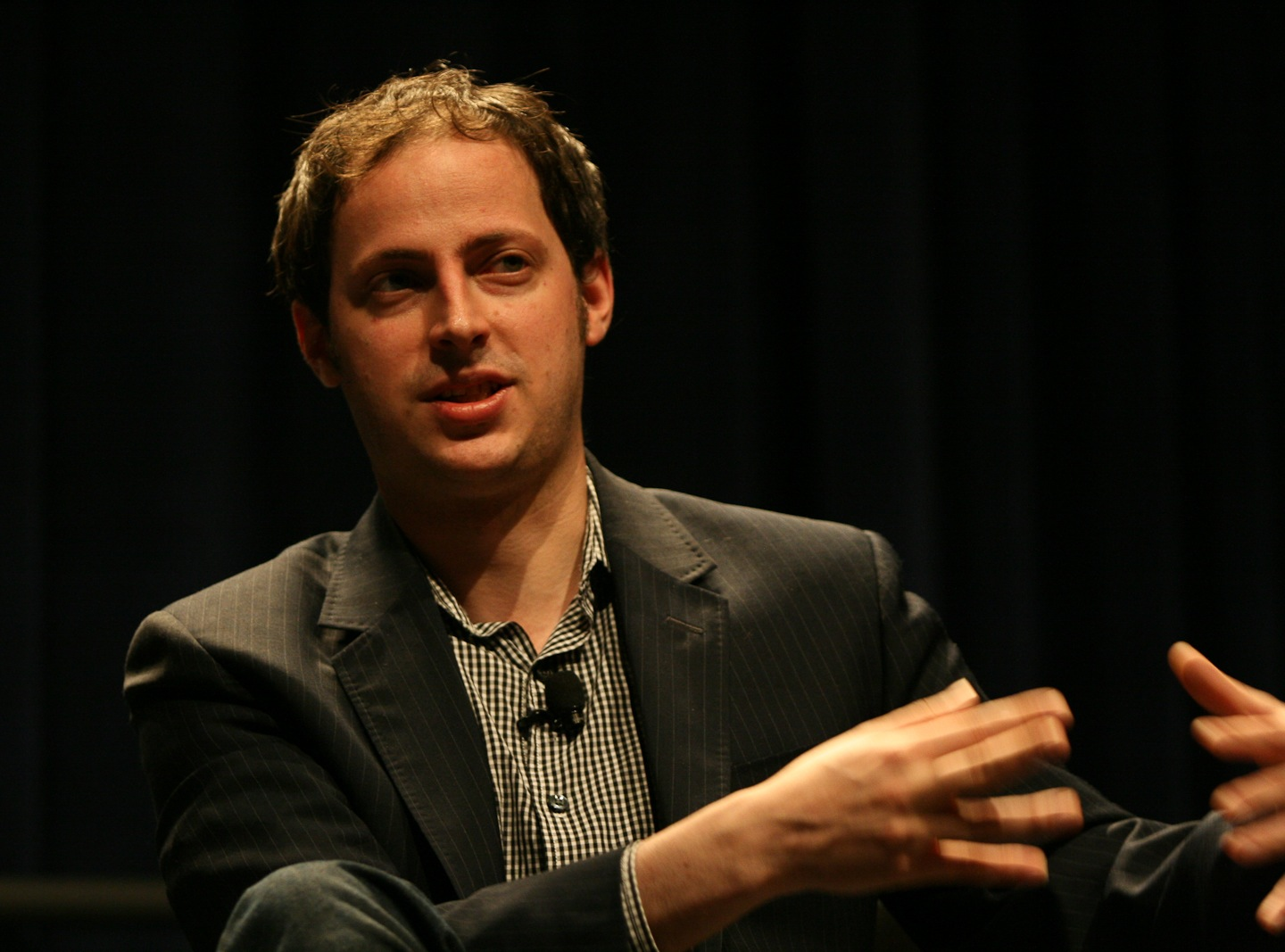
Silver at SXSW in 2009

On November 1, 2007, while still employed by Baseball Prospectus, Silver began publishing a diary under the pseudonym "Poblano" on the progressive political blog Daily Kos. Silver set out to analyze quantitative aspects of the political game to enlighten a broader audience. Silver reports that "he was stranded in a New Orleans airport when the idea of FiveThirtyEight.com came to him. 'I was just frustrated with the analysis. ... I saw a lot of discussion about strategy that was not all that sophisticated, especially when it came to quantitative things like polls and demographics'". His forecasts of the 2008 United States presidential primary elections drew considerable attention, including being cited by The New York Times op-ed columnist Bill Kristol.

On March 7, 2008, while still writing as "Poblano", Silver established his own blog, FiveThirtyEight.com. Often colloquially referred to as just 538, the website takes its name from the number of electors in the United States electoral college.

On May 30, 2008, Poblano revealed his identity to FiveThirtyEight.com readers. On June 1, 2008, Silver published a two-page op-ed in the New York Post outlining the rationale underlying his focus on the statistical aspects of politics. He first appeared on national television on CNN's American Morning on June 13, 2008.

Silver described his partisan orientation as follows in the FAQ on his website: "My state [Illinois] has non-partisan registration, so I am not registered as anything. I vote for Democratic candidates the majority of the time (though by no means always). This year, I have been a supporter of Barack Obama." With respect to the impartiality of his electoral projections, Silver stated, "Are [my] results biased toward [my] preferred candidates? I hope not, but that is for you to decide. I have tried to disclose as much about my methodology as possible."

==== 2008 election and aftermath ====
Shortly after the November 4 election, ESPN writer Jim Caple observed, "Forget Cole Hamels and the Phillies. No one in baseball had a more impressive fall than Nate Silver.... [R]ight now Silver is exhausted. He barely slept the last couple weeks of the campaign—'By the end, it was full-time plus'—and for that matter, he says he couldn't have kept it up had the campaign lasted two days longer. Plus, he has his Baseball Prospectus duties. 'We write our [Baseball Prospectus 2009] book from now through the first of the year,' [Silver] said. 'I have a week to relax and then it gets just as busy again. In February 2009 I will just have to find an island in the Caribbean and throw my BlackBerry in the ocean.'"

Later in November 2008, Silver signed a contract with Penguin Group USA to write two books, reportedly for a $700,000 advance.

Silver was invited to be a speaker at TED 2009 in February 2009, and keynote speaker at the 2009 South by Southwest (SXSW) Interactive conference (March 2009).

While maintaining his FiveThirtyEight.com website, in January 2009 Silver began a monthly feature column, "The Data", in Esquire as well as contributed occasional articles to other media such as The New York Times and The Wall Street Journal. He also tried his luck in the 2009 World Series of Poker.

The success of his FiveThirtyEight.com blog marked the effective end of Silver's career as baseball analyst, though he continued to devote some attention to sports statistics and sports economics in his blog. In March 2009, he stepped down as Managing Partner of Baseball Prospectus and handed over responsibility for producing future PECOTA projections to other Baseball Prospectus staff members. In April 2009, he appeared as an analyst on ESPN's Baseball Tonight. After March 2009, he published only two "Lies, Damned Lies" columns on BaseballProspectus.com.

In November 2009, ESPN introduced a new Soccer Power Index (SPi), designed by Nate Silver, for predicting the outcome of the 2010 FIFA World Cup. He published a post-mortem after the tournament, comparing his predictions to those of alternative rating systems.

In April 2010, in an assignment for New York magazine, Silver created a quantitative index of "The Most Livable Neighborhoods in New York".

==== Transition to The New York Times ====
On June 3, 2010, Silver announced on FiveThirtyEight

In the near future, the blog will "re-launch" under a NYTimes.com domain. It will retain its own identity (akin to other Times blogs like DealBook), but will be organized under the News:Politics section. Once this occurs, content will no longer be posted at FiveThirtyEight.com on an ongoing basis, and the blog will re-direct to the new URL. In addition, I will be contributing content to the print edition of The New York Times, and to the Sunday Magazine. The partnership agreement, which is structured as a license, has a term of three years.

The New York Times "FiveThirtyEight: Nate Silver's Political Calculus" commenced on August 25, 2010, with the publication of "New Forecast Shows Democrats Losing 6 to 7 Senate Seats". From that date the blog focused almost exclusively on forecasting the outcomes of the 2010 U.S. Senate and U.S. House of Representatives elections as well as state gubernatorial contests. Silver's Times Sunday Magazine feature first appeared on November 19, 2010, under the heading "Go Figure". It was later titled "Acts of Mild Subversion".

While blogging for The Times, Silver also worked on his book about prediction, which was published in September 2012. At that time, Silver began to drop hints that after 2012 he would turn his attention to matters other than detailed statistical forecasting of elections. As reported in New York magazine: " 'I view my role now as providing more of a macro-level skepticism, rather than saying this poll is good or this poll is evil,' he says. And in four [years], he might be even more macro, as he turns his forecasting talents to other fields. 'I'm 97 percent sure that the FiveThirtyEight model will exist in 2016,' he says, 'but it could be someone else who's running it or licensing it.'"

During the last year of FiveThirtyEight's license to The New York Times, it drew a very large volume of online traffic to the paper:

The Times does not release traffic figures, but a spokesperson said yesterday that Silver's blog provided a significant—and significantly growing, over the past year—percentage of Times pageviews. This fall, visits to the Times' political coverage (including FiveThirtyEight) have increased, both absolutely and as a percentage of site visits. But FiveThirtyEight's growth is staggering: where earlier this year, somewhere between 10 and 20 percent of politics visits included a stop at FiveThirtyEight, last week that figure was 71 percent.

But Silver's blog has buoyed more than just the politics coverage, becoming a significant traffic-driver for the site as a whole. Earlier this year, approximately 1 percent of visits to the New York Times included FiveThirtyEight. Last week, that number was 13 percent. Yesterday, it was 20 percent. That is, one in five visitors to the sixth-most-trafficked U.S. news site took a look at Silver's blog.

==== Departure from The Times ====
Silver on leaving The New York Times

In an online chat session a week after the 2012 election Silver commented: "As tempting as it might be to pull a Jim Brown/Sandy Koufax and just mic-drop/retire from elections forecasting, I expect that we'll be making forecasts in 2014 and 2016. Midterm elections can be dreadfully boring, unfortunately. But the 2016 G.O.P. primary seems almost certain to be epic." In late November 2012, Times executive editor Jill Abramson declared her wish to keep Silver and his blog: "We would love to have Nate continue to be part of The New York Times family, and to expand on what he does", she said. "We know he began in sports anyway, so it is not an exclusively political product. I am excited to talk to Nate when he finishes his book tour about ways to expand that kind of reporting."

On July 22, 2013, ESPN (a subsidiary of the Walt Disney Company) announced that it had acquired ownership of the FiveThirtyEight website and brand, and that "Silver will serve as editor-in-chief of the site and will build a team of journalists, editors, analysts and contributors in the coming months."

The New York Times public editor Margaret Sullivan wrote of Silver's decision to leave for ESPN:

I don't think Nate Silver ever really fit into the Times culture and I think he was aware of that. He was, in a word, disruptive. Much like the Brad Pitt character in the movie "Moneyball" disrupted the old model of how to scout baseball players, Nate disrupted the traditional model of how to cover politics.

She added, "A number of traditional and well-respected Times journalists disliked his work." Later, Sullivan wrote in The Times that "I don't feel so good about not being able to investigate every complaint from every individual reader fully, or about making some misjudgments in individual posts — my Nate Silver commentary, among others, has probably been off-base..."

New York magazine reported that executive editor Jill Abramson "put on a full-court press" to keep Silver at The Times and that "for Abramson, Silver was a tentpole attraction for her favorite subject, national politics, and brought the kind of buzz she thought valuable", but the company's CEO and President Mark Thompson "confirmed that keeping Silver was not at the top of his agenda". The article stated that "the major reason Silver left was because he felt it was Thompson who had not committed to building his franchise. The mixed signals from Thompson and Abramson—his lack of enthusiasm for committing resources to Silver, her desire to keep a major star—frustrated Silver and his lawyer."

==== Disney ownership and departure from FiveThirtyEight ====
When FiveThirtyEight was relaunched under Disney's ESPN on March 17, 2014, Silver outlined the scope of topics that would be covered under the rubric of "data journalism":

We've expanded our staff from two full-time journalists to 20 and counting. Few of them will focus on politics exclusively; instead, our coverage will span five major subject areas — politics, economics, science, life and sports. Our team also has a broad set of skills and experience in methods that fall under the rubric of data journalism. These include statistical analysis, but also data visualization, computer programming and data-literate reporting. So in addition to written stories, we'll have interactive graphics and features. Within a couple of months we'll launch a podcast, and we'll be collaborating with ESPN Films and Grantland to produce original documentary films.

In 2018, the Walt Disney Company transferred the FiveThirtyEight site from the ESPN division to the ABC News division. In April 2023, amid widespread layoffs at Disney and ABC affecting FiveThirtyEight, Silver announced that his contract with ABC would not be extended. After Silver's departure in May, a smaller FiveThirtyEight continued to operate under the data analytics division of ABC News, until being shut down in March 2025.

=== FiveThirtyEight's election forecasts ===
==== 2008 U.S. elections ====
In March 2008, Silver established his blog FiveThirtyEight.com, in which he developed a system for tracking polls and forecasting the outcome of the 2008 general election. At the same time, he continued making forecasts of the 2008 Democratic primary elections. That several of his forecasts based on demographic analysis proved to be substantially more accurate than those of the professional pollsters gained visibility and professional credibility for "Poblano", the pseudonym that Silver was then using.

After the North Carolina and Indiana primaries on May 6, the popularity of FiveThirtyEight.com surged. Silver recalls the scenario: "I know the polls show it's really tight in NC, but we think Obama is going to win by thirteen, fourteen points, and he did. ... Any time you make a prediction like that people give you probably too much credit for it.... But after that [Silver's and the website's popularity] started to really take off. It's pretty nonlinear, once you get one mention in the mainstream media, other people [quickly follow suit]."

As a CNET reporter wrote on election eve, "Even though Silver launched the site as recently as March, its straightforward approach, daring predictions, and short but impressive track record has put it on the map of political sites to follow."

Silver's final 2008 presidential election forecast accurately predicted the winner of 49 of the 50 states and the District of Columbia, missing only the prediction for Indiana. As his model predicted, the races in Missouri and North Carolina were particularly close. He also correctly predicted the winners of every U.S. Senate race. The accuracy of his predictions won him further acclaim, including abroad, and added to his reputation as a leading political prognosticator.

Barack Obama's 2008 presidential campaign signed off on a proposal to share all of its private polling with Silver. After signing a confidentiality agreement, Silver was granted access to hundreds of polls the campaign had conducted.

==== 2010 U.S. elections ====
Shortly after FiveThirtyEight relocated to The New York Times, Silver introduced his prediction models for the 2010 elections to the U.S. Senate, the U.S. House of Representatives, and state governorships. Each of these models relied initially on a combination of electoral history, demographics, and polling. Silver eventually published detailed forecasts and analyses of the results for all three sets of elections. He correctly predicted the winner in 34 of the 37 contested Senate races. His 2010 congressional mid-term predictions were not as accurate as those made in 2008, but were still within the reported confidence interval. Silver predicted a Republican pickup of 54 seats in the House of Representatives; the GOP won 63 seats. Of the 37 gubernatorial races, FiveThirtyEight correctly predicted the winner of 36.

==== 2012 U.S. elections ====
Although throughout 2011 Silver devoted a lot of attention on his blog to the 2012 Republican party primaries, his first effort to handicap the 2012 presidential general election appeared as the cover story in The New York Times Magazine a year prior to the election: "Is Obama Toast? Handicapping the 2012 Election". Accompanying the online release of this article, Silver also published "Choose Obama's Re-Election Adventure", an interactive toy that allowed readers to predict the outcome of the election based on their assumptions about three variables: President Obama's favorability ratings, the rate of GDP growth, and how conservative the Republican opponent would be. This analysis stimulated a lot of critical discussion.

While publishing numerous stories on the Republican primary elections, in mid-February 2012 Silver reprised and updated his previous Magazine story with another one, "What Obama Should Do Next". This story painted a more optimistic picture of President Obama's re-election chances. A companion article on his FiveThirtyEight blog, "The Fundamentals Now Favor Obama", explained how the model and the facts on the ground had changed between November and February.

Silver published the first iteration of his 2012 general election forecasts on June 7, 2012. According to the model, at that time Barack Obama was projected to win 291 electoral votes—21 more than the 270 required for a majority. Obama then had an estimated 61.8% chance of winning a majority.

On the morning of the November 6, 2012, presidential election, the final update of Silver's model at 10:10 A.M. gave President Barack Obama a 90.9% chance of winning a majority of the 538 electoral votes. Both in summary tables and in an electoral map, Silver forecast the winner of each state. At the conclusion of that day, when Mitt Romney had conceded to Barack Obama, Silver's model had correctly predicted the winner of every one of the 50 states and the District of Columbia. Silver, along with at least three academic-based analysts—Drew Linzer, Simon Jackman, and Josh Putnam—who also aggregated polls from multiple pollsters—thus was not only broadly correct about the election outcome, but also specifically predicted the outcomes for the nine swing states. In contrast, individual pollsters were less successful. For example, Rasmussen Reports "missed on six of its nine swing-state polls".

==== 2016 U.S. elections ====
In the week leading up to the 2016 U.S. presidential election, the FiveThirtyEight team predicted that Hillary Clinton had a 64.5% chance of winning the election. Their final prediction on November 8, 2016, gave Clinton a 71% chance to win the 2016 United States presidential election, while other major forecasters had predicted Clinton to win with at least an 85% to 99% probability. Donald Trump won the election. FiveThirtyEight argued it projected a much higher chance (29%) of Donald Trump winning the presidency than other modelers, a projection which was criticized days before the election by Ryan Grim of The Huffington Post as "unskewing" too much in favor of Trump.

==== 2020 U.S. elections ====
In their final prediction of the 2020 United States presidential election, FiveThirtyEight predicted that Joe Biden had an 89% chance of winning the election; Biden won both the Electoral College and the popular vote. FiveThirtyEight only missed Florida, North Carolina, and Maine's 2nd congressional district in their projections. Donald Trump prevailed in each of these contests, in which FiveThirtyEight forecast the better chances for Biden to win.

=== Reception ===
Silver has been criticized for inaccurate predictions. In January 2010, journalist and blogger Colby Cosh criticized Silver's performance during the Massachusetts special Senate election, saying he was "still arguing as late as Thursday afternoon that [Martha] Coakley was the clear favourite; he changed his mind at midnight that evening and acknowledged that Scott Brown had a puncher's chance". (Brown won the election.)

Silver's quantitative focus on polling data, without insight from experience in political organizing or journalism, has been a recurring critique from experienced commentators. Huffington Post columnist Geoffrey Dunn described Silver as someone who "has never organized a precinct in his life, much less walked one, pontificating about the dynamics in the electoral processes as if he actually understood them".

Considerable criticism during the 2012 elections came from political conservatives, who argued that Silver's election projections were politically biased against Mitt Romney, the Republican candidate for president. For example, Silver was accused of applying a double standard to his treatment of Rasmussen Reports polls, such as a 2010 analysis asserting a statistical bias in its methodology. Josh Jordan wrote in National Review that Silver clearly favored Obama and adjusted the weight he gave polls "based on what [he] think[s] of the pollster and the results and not based on what is actually inside the poll".

On MSNBC's Morning Joe, host Joe Scarborough stated that Silver's prediction that day of a 73.6% chance of a win for Obama greatly exceeded the confidence of the Obama campaign itself, which Scarborough equated to that of the Romney campaign, both believing "they have a 50.1 percent chance of winning", and calling Silver an "ideologue" and a "joke". Silver responded with the offer of a $1,000 wager (for charity) over the outcome of the election. The New York Times public editor Margaret Sullivan, while defending Silver's analysis, characterized the wager as "a bad idea" as it gave the appearance of a partisan motive for Silver, and "inappropriate" for someone perceived as a Times journalist (although Silver was not a member of the newspaper's staff).

After a post-election appearance by Silver on Joe Scarborough's Morning Joe, Scarborough published what he called a "(semi) apology", in which he concluded:

"I won't apologize to Mr. Silver for predicting an outcome that I had also been predicting for a year. But I do need to tell Nate I'm sorry for leaning in too hard and lumping him with pollsters whose methodology is as rigorous as the Simpsons' strip mall physician, Dr. Nick. For those sins (and a multitude of others that I'm sure I don't even know about), I am sorry.

"Politics is a messy sport. And just as ball players who drink beer and eat fried chicken in dugouts across America can screw up the smartest sabermetrician's forecast, Nate Silver's formula is sure to let his fervent admirers down from time to time. But judging from what I saw of him this morning, Nate is a grounded guy who admits as much in his book. I was too tough on him and there's a 84.398264% chance I will be less dismissive of his good work in the future."

Silver's nondisclosure of the details of his analytical model has resulted in some skepticism. Washington Post journalist Ezra Klein wrote: "There are good criticisms to make of Silver's model, not the least of which is that, while Silver is almost tediously detailed about what's going on in the model, he won't give out the code, and without the code, we can't say with certainty how the model works." Colby Cosh wrote that the model "is proprietary and irreproducible. That last feature makes it unwise to use Silver's model as a straw stand-in for 'science', as if the model had been fully specified in a peer-reviewed journal".

== Post-FiveThirtyEight career: since 2023 ==
After departing FiveThirtyEight amid widespread layoffs at Disney/ABC News in May 2023, Silver began publishing on his personal blog, Silver Bulletin. Silver retained the IP of 538's election forecasting model as he left, and in June 2024, released his own election forecasting model at Silver Bulletin, using methodology similar to his model at 538.

In June 2024, Silver joined the prediction market startup Polymarket as an advisor. In August of the same year, Silver published his book On the Edge: The Art of Risking Everything, exploring how calculated risks can yield benefits in diverse fields, from finance and poker to effective altruism.

In November 2024, Silver said of his income from Silver Bulletin, "It’s very good money, and definitely more than I was making working for a network." At that time his blog was ranked third on Substack's politics leaderboard with 282,000 subscribers. As of November 2026, Silver's Substack has 382,000 subscribers.

In 2026, the original hosts of the 538 politics podcast (Galen Druke, Clare Malone, and Nate Silver) reunited for a new podcast, Still Counting, on the Crooked Media network. Although Crooked Media is a partisan network, the podcast is non-partisan.

=== 2024 U.S. elections ===
During the lead-up to the 2024 elections between Donald Trump and Kamala Harris, Silver criticized the new model used by 538 (developed by G. Elliott Morris). Silver described it as at best ignoring the polls and overly weighting Biden's incumbency, and at worst as being "buggy". After Biden withdrew from the race, 538 overhauled their model to put more emphasis on polls.

Silver's final forecast for the election gave Trump and Harris almost an exactly even chance of winning the Electoral College (50.015% for Harris, 49.985% for Trump). His model also forecast that a Trump victory in all seven swing states was the single most likely outcome (at over 20% likelihood), and that a comfortable Electoral College victory of some form had better than even odds of occurring (with over 60% likelihood that one candidate would win at least six swing states). Trump won the Presidency and all seven swing states.

Silver's final forecast also gave the advantage (i.e. greater than 50% odds of winning) to the eventual winner in 48 out of the 50 states, as well as the District of Columbia and all congressional districts awarding electoral votes. Only Trump's victories in Michigan and Wisconsin did not occur in the majority of Silver's final simulations.

== The Signal and the Noise ==
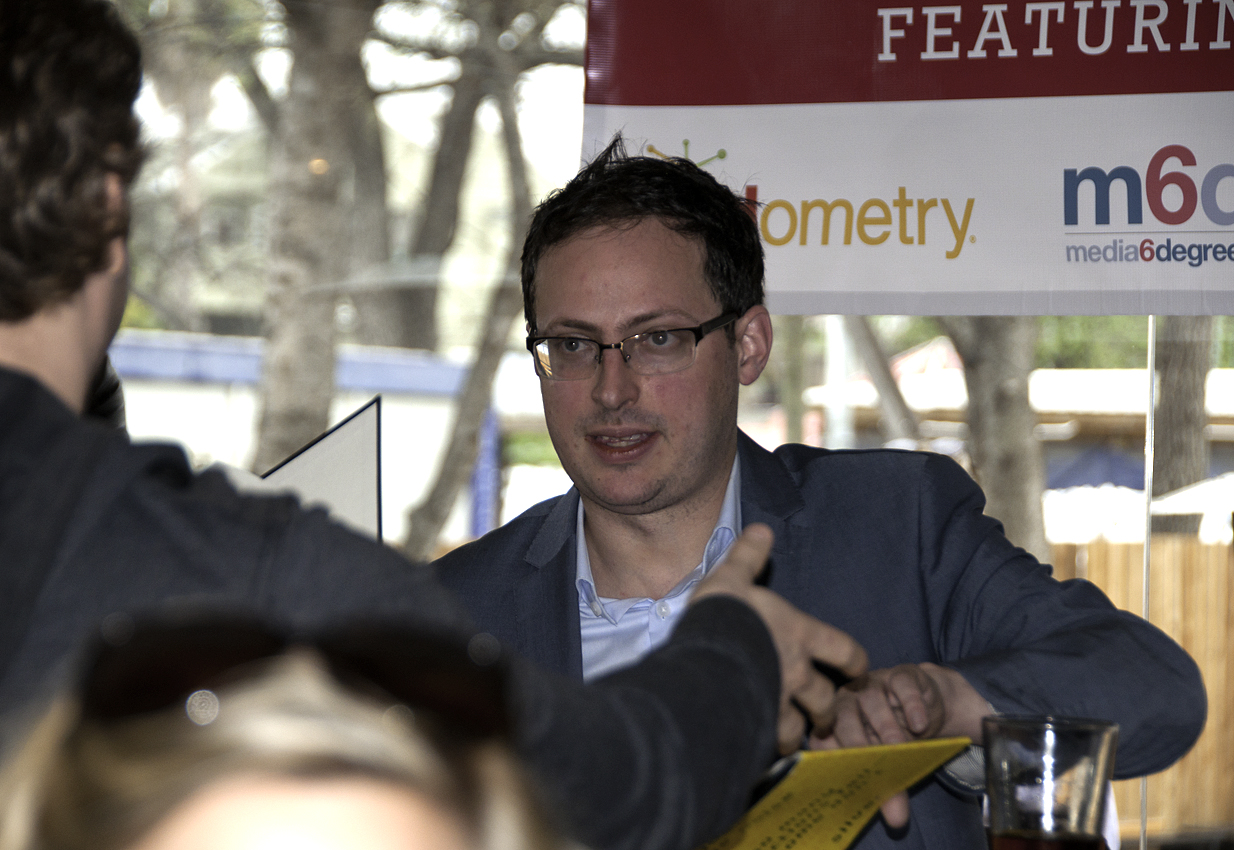
Silver signing a copy of The Signal and the Noise at SXSW 2013

The Signal and The Noise was published in the United States on September 27, 2012. It reached the New York Times Best Sellers List as #12 for non-fiction hardback books after its first week in print. It dropped to #20 in the second week, before rising to #13 in the third, and remaining on the non-fiction hardback top 15 list for the following 13 weeks, with a highest weekly ranking of #4. Sales increased after the election on November 6, jumping 800% and becoming the second best seller on Amazon.com.

The book describes methods of mathematical model-building using probability and statistics. Silver takes a big-picture approach to using statistical tools, combining sources of unique data (e.g., timing a minor league ball player's fastball using a radar gun), with historical data and principles of sound statistical analysis; Silver argues that many of these are violated by many pollsters and pundits who nonetheless have important media roles. Case studies in the book include baseball, elections, climate change, the financial crash, poker, and weather forecasting. These different topics illustrate different statistical principles. As a reviewer in The New York Times notes: "It's largely about evaluating predictions in a variety of fields, from finance to weather to epidemiology. We learn about a handful of successes: when, for instance, meteorologists predict a hurricane's landfall 72 hours in advance.... But mostly we learn about failures. It turns out we're not even close to predicting the next catastrophic earthquake or the spread of the next killer bird flu, despite the enormous amounts of brainpower trained on these questions in the past few decades."

== Blogs and other publications ==
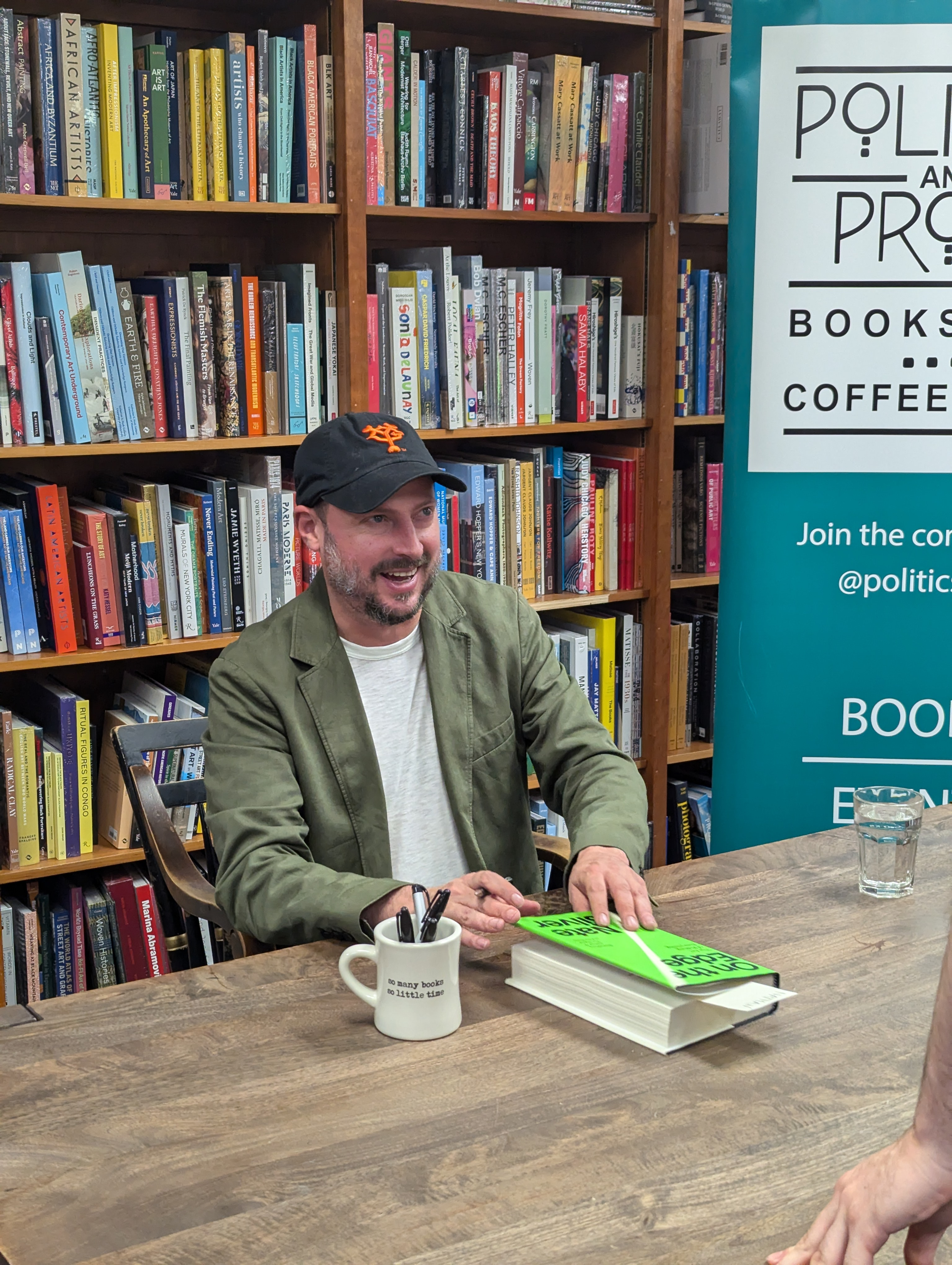
Silver signing copies of his book On the Edge: The Art of Risking Everything at Politics and Prose in 2024

Blogs

- FiveThirtyEight blog, now owned by ABC (archived)
- Nate Silver's Baseball Prospectus article archive (2003–2009)
- Nate Silver's The Burrito Bracket (2007)
- Nate Silver's Silver Bulletin

Books

- The Signal and the Noise. Penguin Group. 2012.
- On the Edge: The Art of Risking Everything. Penguin Press. 2024.

Other publications

- Nate Silver, "The Most Livable Neighborhoods in New York: A Quantitative Index of the 50 Most Satisfying Places to Live", New York, April 11, 2010.
- Nate Silver, "The Influence Index", Time, April 29, 2010.
- Nate Silver and Walter Hickey, "Best Picture Math", Vanity Fair, March 2014.
- Gareth Cook (Editor), Nate Silver (Introduction). The Best American Infographics 2014, Houghton Mifflin Harcourt. ISBN 978-0547974514.
- Review of two children's books, with an autobiographical comment: "Beautiful Minds: The Boy Who Loved Math and On a Beam of Light", The New York Times, July 12, 2013.
- Andrew Gelman, Nate Silver, Aaron S. Edlin, "What Is the Probability Your Vote Will Make a Difference", Economic Inquiry, 2012, 50(2): 321–26.
- In addition to chapters in several issues of the Baseball Prospectus annual, Silver contributed chapters to one-off monographs edited by Baseball Prospectus, including:
  - Mind Game: How the Boston Red Sox Got Smart, Won a World Series, and Created a New Blueprint for Winning. Steven Goldman, Ed. New York: Workman Publishing Co., 2005. ISBN 0-7611-4018-2.
  - Baseball Between the Numbers: Why Everything You Know about the Game Is Wrong. Jonah Keri, Ed. New York: Basic Books, 2006. ISBN 0-465-00596-9 (hardback) and ISBN 0-465-00547-0 (paperback).
  - It Ain't over 'til It's over: The Baseball Prospectus Pennant Race Book. Steven Goldman, Ed. New York: Basic Books. Hardback 2007. ISBN 0-465-00284-6; paperback 2008. ISBN 0-465-00285-4.

== Media ==
Silver's self-unmasking at the end of May 2008 brought him a lot of publicity focused on his combined skill as both baseball statistician-forecaster and political statistician-forecaster, including articles about him in The Wall Street Journal, Newsweek, Science News, and his hometown Lansing State Journal.

In early June he began to cross-post his daily "Today's Polls" updates on "The Plank" in The New Republic. Also, Rasmussen Reports began to use the FiveThirtyEight.com poll averages for its own tracking of the 2008 state-by-state races.

In 2009 through 2012, Silver appeared as a political analyst on MSNBC, CNN and Bloomberg Television, PBS, NPR, Democracy Now!, The Charlie Rose Show, ABC News, and Current TV.

Silver also appeared on The Colbert Report (October 7, 2008, and November 5, 2012), The Daily Show (October 17, 2012, and November 7, 2012), and Real Time with Bill Maher (October 26, 2012).

That Silver accurately predicted the outcome of the 2012 presidential race, in the face of numerous public attacks on his forecasts by critics, inspired many articles in the press, ranging from Gizmodo, to online and mainstream newspapers, news and commentary magazines, business media, trade journals, media about media, and Scientific American, as well as a feature interview on The Today Show, a return appearance on The Daily Show, and an appearance on Morning Joe.

Silver's first appearance on ABC News as editor-in-chief of the new FiveThirtyEight.com was on George Stephanopoulos's This Week on November 3, 2013.

Silver is referenced in the Syfy channel show The Magicians as an earth wizard who uses polling spells.

In 2015, Silver appeared on the podcast Employee of the Month, where he criticized Vox Media for "recycling Wikipedia entries" in their content.

== Selected recognition and awards ==
- April 30, 2009: Silver was named one of "The World's 100 Most Influential People" by TIME magazine.
- May 12, 2013: Silver received an honorary Doctor of Science degree (Scientiæ Doctor honoris causa – D.Sc. h.c.) and gave the commencement address at Ripon College.
- May 24, 2013: Silver received an honorary Doctor of Literature degree (Doctor of Literature honoris causa) and presented a commencement address at The New School.
- October 2013: Silver's The Signal and the Noise won the 2013 Phi Beta Kappa Award in Science, which recognizes "outstanding contributions by scientists to the literature of science".
- December 2013: The University of Leuven (KU Leuven) (Belgium) and the Leuven Statistics Research Centre awarded Silver an honorary doctoral degree "for his prominent role in the development, application, and dissemination of proper prediction methods in sports and in political sciences".
- May 25, 2014: Silver received a Doctorate of Humane Letters, honoris causa, from Amherst College.
- May 2017: Georgetown University awarded Silver a degree of Doctor of Humane Letters honoris causa.
- May 2018: Kenyon College awarded Silver a degree, Doctor of Humane Letters.

== Personal life ==
Silver is a great-nephew of geologists Caswell Silver and Leon Silver. He is a great-grandson of Harmon Lewis, the President of Alcoa Steamship Company, as well as a great-great-nephew of the embryologist Warren Harmon Lewis and his wife, biologist Margaret Reed Lewis.

Silver is gay, and lives with his longtime partner Robert Gauldin in Manhattan. "I've always felt like something of an outsider. I've always had friends but I've always come from an outside point of view. I think that's important. If you grow up gay or in a household that's agnostic when most people are religious, then from the get-go, you are saying there are things the majority of society believes that I don't believe", he told an interviewer in 2012. When asked "what made you feel more of a misfit, being gay or being a geek", he replied, "Probably the numbers stuff since I had that from when I was six." When asked in 2008 if he had noticed people looking at him as a "gay icon", he responded, "I've started to notice it a little bit although so far it seems like I'm more a subject of geek affection than gay affection".

Silver discussed his sexuality in the context of growing up in East Lansing in an article about the Supreme Court ruling Obergefell v. Hodges in favor of recognizing same-sex marriage on the date of its announcement. He analyzed the speed of the change of public sentiment, pointing out that the change over only several decades has been palpable to the current generations.

Silver has long been interested in fantasy baseball, especially Scoresheet Baseball. While in college he served as an expert on Scoresheet Baseball for BaseballHQ. When he took up political writing, Silver abandoned his blog, The Burrito Bracket, in which he ran a one-and-done competition among the taquerias in his Wicker Park neighborhood in Chicago.

Silver plays poker semi-professionally. He has $981,884 in total tournament earnings, including an 87th-place finish in the 2023 World Series of Poker Main Event.

=== Political views ===
In a 2012 interview with Charlie Rose, Silver said, "I'd say I'm somewhere in between being a libertarian and a liberal. So if I were to vote, it would be kind of a Gary Johnson versus Mitt Romney decision, I suppose." In a 2023 newsletter, Silver said that he misspoke during that interview and meant to say that he would have chosen between Johnson and Barack Obama. He added that he has voted for the Democratic candidate in every presidential election he has participated in, though he registered as a Republican and voted for John Kasich in the 2016 New York Republican presidential primary as he believed "the difference between a Kasich-led GOP and a Trump-led GOP would make a big difference to the future of the country".

Silver has also criticized "the progressive political class", believing that it has become "more left and less liberal". In 2024, he said that he voted for Kathy Hochul in the 2022 New York gubernatorial election and Kamala Harris in the 2024 presidential election, but has also criticized some of the Democratic Party's actions and political positions.

== See also ==
- Computational statistics
- Editorial board
- LGBT culture in New York City
- List of LGBT people from New York City
- New Yorkers in journalism
- Political analysis
- Sports betting
- Superforecaster
