= Clare Malone =

American journalist

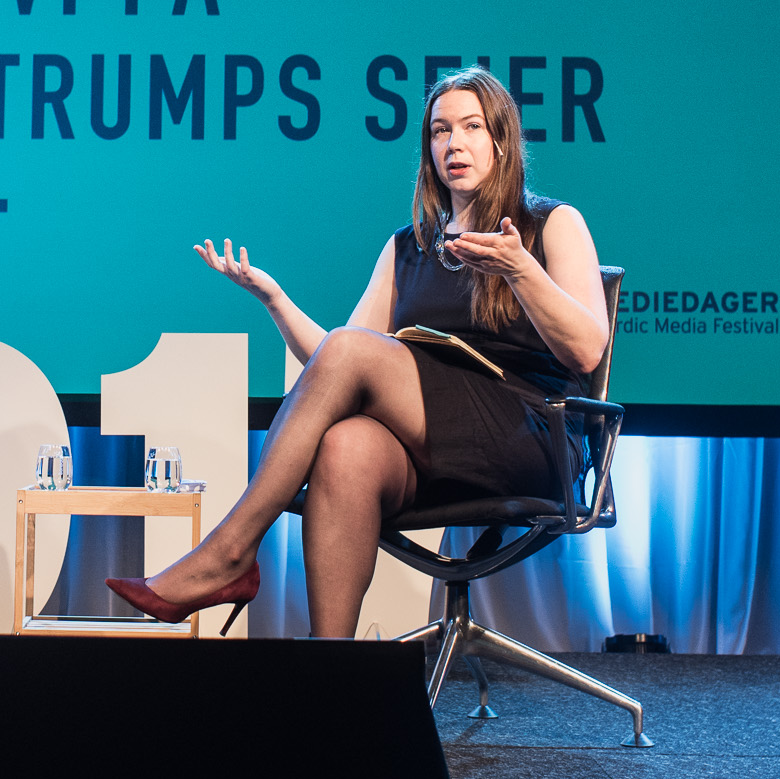
- Malone in 2017
- Born: Shaker Heights, Ohio, U.S.
- Education: Georgetown University (BA)
- Occupation: Journalist
- Employer: The New Yorker

Clare Malone is an American journalist who is a staff writer at The New Yorker. She previously worked at the political analysis outlet FiveThirtyEight.

== Early life and education ==
Malone was raised in Shaker Heights, Ohio, along with her two brothers and three sisters. She attended Georgetown University, where she rowed for the Georgetown Hoyas. She graduated in 2009 with a degree in government.

== Career ==
Malone began her journalism career working at The American Prospect before eventually writing full-time for FiveThirtyEight. At FiveThirtyEight, Malone covered Donald Trump's successful 2016 presidential campaign and became the outlet's senior political writer. She also hosted the FiveThirtyEight political podcast with Harry Enten and Nate Silver.

In 2021, Malone was hired by The New Yorker, covering the media industry and politics.

In September 2023, Malone wrote an expose alleging that the comedian Hasan Minhaj had embellished claims of experiencing racism in his comedy sets. The article was one of the magazine's top twenty five articles of the year. Minhaj defended himself, saying his comedy contained "emotional truths", and were exaggerations of real experiences that had happened to him. According to Minhaj, Comedy Central revoked his offer to succeed Trevor Noah as the host of The Daily Show after the article came out.

On October 23, 2023, Minhaj put out a 20-minute Youtube video in response accusing Malone of splicing together quotes, removing exonerating or mitigating context and other malicious editing or presenting of evidence to leave readers with the impression three stories mentioned in the article were not only exaggerated but did not occur using audio recordings of his conversations with Malone along with other documentation relating to the incident. Malone responded to the video on X three days later saying she "stood by her reporting" and reiterated criticisms Minhaj conceded.

In May 2024, Malone reported on the creation and launch of Hunterbrook.

In August 2024, Malone reported that Robert F. Kennedy Jr., who was then running for president as a third-party candidate, had dumped a bear carcass in Central Park as a joke. Kennedy attempted to get ahead of Malone's story by recounting the incident in a video posted to his X account. Kennedy's confession led to mockery and memes on social media.

Malone has also reported extensively about cultural issues in The New York Times and The Washington Post. She later reported on Jeff Bezos' ownership of The Washington Post.

In September 2026, Malone reunited with her FiveThirtyEight Politics podcast co-hosts Nate Silver and Galen Druke to host the podcast Still Counting with Crooked Media. The first episode of Still Counting premiered on September 9.
