= Leon Silver =

American geologist (1925–2022)

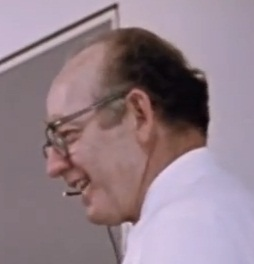
- Silver in 1972 during the Apollo 17 landing
- Born: Leon Theodore Silver; April 9, 1925; Monticello, New York, U.S.
- Died: January 31, 2022 (aged 96); Arcadia, California, U.S.
- Other name: Lee Silver
- Education: Ph.D., Geology & Geochemistry (1955)
- Alma mater: California Institute of Technology (Caltech)
- Occupation: Geology professor
- Employer: Caltech (emeritus)
- Known for: Training of Apollo astronauts in field geology

Leon Theodore "Lee" Silver (April 9, 1925 – January 31, 2022) was an American geologist who was professor of geology at the California Institute of Technology (Caltech). He was an instructor to the Apollo 13, 15, 16, and 17 astronaut crews. Working with the National Aeronautics and Space Administration (NASA), he taught astronauts how to perform field geology, essentially creating lunar field geology as a new discipline. His training is credited with a significant improvement in the J-Mission Apollo flights' scientific returns. After the Apollo program, he became a member of the United States National Academy of Sciences in 1974. He retired in 1996 as the W. M. Keck Foundation Professor for Resource Geology, emeritus, at Caltech.

== Early life and education ==
Silver was born in Monticello, New York, on April 9, 1925, as the youngest of five children. His parents were immigrants from Russia and Poland, who moved the family to Waterbury, Connecticut soon after he was born. He graduated from Crosby High School in 1942.

After spending a year at the Colorado School of Mines before being called up by the Navy in 1943 as a member of the Navy V-12 Program, Silver earned his B.S. in civil engineering at the University of Colorado Boulder in 1945. He later earned an M.S. in geology at the University of New Mexico in 1948 and a Ph.D. in geology and geochemistry at the California Institute of Technology in 1955.

== Career ==
=== Early career ===
Silver served in the United States Navy from 1943 to 1946, where he attained the rank of Lieutenant Junior Grade in the Civil Engineer Corps. He worked for the United States Geological Survey (USGS), Mineral Deposits Branch, in Colorado and Arizona from 1947 to 1954 (field seasons only), where he attained the status of Assistant Geologist.

=== Academic career ===
After completing his Ph.D., Silver was appointed Assistant Professor of Geology (1955–1962) at Caltech; he was later promoted to Associate Professor (1962–1965), Professor (1965–1983), and W. M. Keck Foundation Professor for Resource Geology (1983–1996). After his retirement, he had been Keck Professor Emeritus.

His main research interests were petrology, tectonics, and applications of geology and isotope geochemistry to geochronology, crustal evolution, ore deposits, and comparative planetology. While pursuing these research interests, Silver also played a major role in the Apollo Program's lunar geological exploration as well as on numerous national scientific advisory boards and committees.

=== NASA and Apollo Program involvement ===
NASA's Johnson Space Center Oral History Project lists Silver's involvement as follows:

- Geologist, Astrogeology Branch of the U.S. Geological Survey, (1970–1976, part-time), contracted to work with NASA
- Geology Lecturer to NASA Scientist-Astronaut Classes, Manned Spacecraft Center, Houston, Texas (Part Time 1968–1993)
- Lunar Surface Geology Experiment Team (Apollo 13–17)
- Lunar Sample Preliminary Examination Team (Apollo 15–17)
- Lunar Surface Traverse Planning Team (Apollo 15–17)
- Lunar Science Working Panel (Apollo 15–17)
- Lunar Sample Analysis Planning Team, Manned Spacecraft Center, Houston, Texas (1972–1974)
- Space Program Advisory Council Ad Hoc Subcommittee on Scientist-Astronauts (1974–1975)

=== Other federal government advisory roles ===
- Chairman of the Advisory Committee to the Office of Basic Energy Sciences of the Department of Energy (1990–91 and 1991–92)
- Member of the Steering Committee of the NASA Synthesis Group, which evaluated mission scenarios for the President's Space Exploration Initiative (1990-1991)
- Member of the President's Advisory Committee on the Redesign of the Space Station (1993)

== In popular culture ==
Silver's work with the Apollo Program has been recounted in Andrew Chaikin's A Man on the Moon (1994). The book became a TV mini-series in 1998, with David Clennon portraying Silver in the HBO docu-drama series From The Earth To The Moon. In the series' Episode 10 "Galileo Was Right," Silver is shown teaching the Apollo 15 astronauts field geology, and participating from Houston's Mission Control in their lunar extra-vehicular activities (Moonwalks). Silver was interviewed about the episode and he felt that it "romanticized" the experience, and had minor historical inaccuracies, but otherwise liked it and showed it at a lecture in 1999.

In 2006, Apollo 15 Commander Dave Scott devoted a section of his co-authored book Two Sides of the Moon to the training and instruction that Scott and other Apollo astronauts received from Silver.

== Personal life and death ==
Silver was a board member of the Caswell Silver Foundation at the University of New Mexico. The Foundation was created in 1980 through an endowment by Caswell Silver, an alumnus of the Department of Geology, independent oilman, and Leon Silver's brother. The Foundation supports education and research at the Department of Earth and Planetary Sciences at the University of New Mexico. He died on January 31, 2022, at the age of 96. His grandnephew is statistician and journalist Nate Silver.

== Honors and awards ==
- In 1971 Silver was awarded a NASA Exceptional Scientific Achievement Medal both for his training of Apollo astronauts in geologic science and equally for his research:

For his significant scientific achievements in the development of highly precise isotopic compositions of uranium and lead in minerals and the applications of the age determination procedures in the analyses of lunar material. While diligently conducting these laboratory investigations of lunar material, he provided a major contribution by training the astronauts in geological sciences which, through his enthusiasm, leadership and guidance, has led to the successful exploration of the moon.

- Guggenheim Fellowship (1964)
- NASA Exceptional Scientific Achievement Medal (1971)
- NASA Group Achievement Award, Lunar Traverse Planning Team (1971)
- NASA Group Achievement Award, Crew Training and Simulation Team (1971)
- American Institute of Professional Geologists Award for Professional Excellence (1972)
- NASA Group Achievement Award, Lunar Landing Team (1973)
- NASA Group Achievement Award, Earth Resources Experiment Team (1974)
- NASA Group Achievement Award, Lyndon B. Johnson Space Center (1974)
- Member, National Academy of Sciences (elected 1974)
- Senior Fellow, Mineralogical Society of America
- President, Geological Society of America (1979)
- Centennial Distinguished Alumnus Award, University of New Mexico (1989)

== Selected publications ==
- Silver, L.T., S. Deutsch, and C.R. McKinney, "Fusion Loss of Lead in the Analysis of Zircons for Isotopic Age Dating," Journal of Geophysical Research, Volume 64, Number 8, pages 1124–1124. (1959).
- Allen, Clarence R., Leon T. Silver, and Francis Greenough Stehli. Agua Blanca Fault: A Major Transverse Structure Of Northern Baja California, Mexico. New York: The Society, 1960.
- Silver, L.T., C.R. McKinney, and S. Deutsch et al. "Precambrian Age Determinations of Some Crystalline Rocks of the San Gabriel Mountains of Southern California," Journal of Geophysical Research, Volume 65, Number 8, pages 2522–2523. (1960).
- Silver, L.T., "Major Magmatic Events and Geochronology," Journal of Geophysical Research, Volume 66, Number 8, pages 2560–2560. (1961).
- Silver, L.T. "Older Precambrian Geochronology in Cochise County, Southeastern Arizona," Journal of Geophysical Research, Volume 67, Number 4, pages 1657–1657. (1962).
- Leon T. Silver and Sarah Deutsch. "Uranium-Lead Isotopic Variations in Zircons: A Case Study," The Journal of Geology, Volume 71, Number 6 (November 1963), pages 721–758.
- Silver, L.T., C.R. McKinney, and S. Deutsch et al. "Precambrian Age Determinations in the Western San Gabriel Mountains, California," Journal of Geology, Volume 71, Number 2, page 196ff. (1963).
- Cooper, John Roberts, and Leon T. Silver. Geology And Ore Deposits Of The Dragoon Quadrangle, Cochise County, Arizona. Washington, DC: U.S. Government Printing Office, 1964.
- R. T. Pidgeon, James R. O'Neil, Leon T. Silver. "Uranium and Lead Isotopic Stability in a Metamict Zircon under Experimental Hydrothermal Conditions, Science, New Series, Volume 154, Number 3756, pages 1538–1540. (December 23, 1966).
- Duke, Michael B., and Leon T. Silver. 1967. "Petrology of eucrites, howardites and mesosiderites," Geochimica et Cosmochimica Acta, Volume 31, Issue 10, October 1967, pages 1637–1665.
- Silver, Leon T., "Uranium-Thorium-Lead Isotope Relations in Lunar Materials," Science, New Series, Volume 167, Number 3918, The Moon Issue, pages 468–471. (January 30, 1970).
- Silver, L.T., "Lead Isotopic Heterogeneity in Lunar Soil 10084,35 and Its Age Implications," Transactions of the American Geophysical Union, Volume 51, Number 4, page 348ff. (1970).
- Silver, L.T., and M. B. Duke, "U-Th-Pb Isotope Relations in Some Basaltic Achondrites," Transactions of the American Geophysical Union, Volume 52, Number 4, page 269ff. (1971).
- Silver, L.T. "U-Th-Pb Isotope Systems in Apollo-11 and Apollo-12 Regolithic Materials and a Possible Age for Copernicus Impact Event," Transactions of the American Geophysical Union, Volume 52, Number 7, page 534ff. (1971).
- Silver, L.T., "Regional Provinciality in the U-Th-Pb Isotope Systems in lunar Soils," Transactions of the American Geophysical Union, Volume 54, Number 4, pages 349–349. (1973).
- Silver, L.T., and Anderson, T.H., 1974, "Possible left-lateral early to middle Mesozoic disruption of the south-western North American craton margin," Geological Society of America Abstracts with Programs, Volume 6, Number 7, pages 955–956.
- Silver, L.T., "Implications of Volatile Leads in Orange, Grey and Green Lunar Soils for an Earth-Like Moon," Transactions of the American Geophysical Union, Volume 55, Number 7, pages 681–681. (1974).
- Silver, L.T., "Thorium-Uranium Fractionation as an Indicator of Petrogenetic Processes," Transactions of the American Geophysical Union, Volume 57, Number 4, pages 353–351. (1976).
- Anderson, T.H., and Silver, L.T., "U-Pb isotope ages of granitic plutons near Cananea, Sonora," Economic Geology and the Bulletin of the Society of Economic Geologists, Volume 72, pages 827–836. (1977).
- Silver, L.T., and T.O. Early. "Rubidium-Strontium Fractionation Domains in Peninsular Ranges Batholith and their Implications for Magmatic Arc Evolution," Transactions of the American Geophysical Union, Volume 58, Number 6, pages 532–532. (1977).
- Silver, L.T. "Regional Uranium Anomaly in Precambrian Basement of Colorado Plateau," Economic Geology, Volume 72, Number 4, pages 740–741. (1977).
- Anderson, T.H. and L.T. Silver, "The role of the Mojave-Sonora megashear in the tectonic evolution of northern Sonora," The role of the Mojave-Sonora megashear in the tectonic evolution of northern Sonora.
- Silver, Leon T. "Problems of Pre-Mesozoic Continental Evolution," in B. Clark Burchfiel, Jack E. Oliver, and Leon T. Silver, Eds., Continental Tectonics, National Research Council, National Academy of Sciences, 1980, Chapter 2: pages 26–30.
- Silver, Leon T., and Peter H. Schultz, eds. Geological Implications Of Impacts Of Large Asteroids and Comets On The Earth: Conference On Large Body Impacts And Terrestrial Evolution: Geological, Climatological, And Biological Implications. Boulder, Colorado: Geological Society of America, 1982.
- Silver, L. T., I.S. Williams and J.A. Woodhead, eds. Uranium In Granites From the Southwestern United States: Actinide Parent-Daughter Systems, Sites and Mobilization: Second Year Report. Grand Junction, Colorado: U.S. Department of Energy, Assistant Secretary for Resource Applications, Grand Junction Office. (1984).
- Silver, L. T., and B. W. Chappell. "The Peninsular Ranges Batholith: An Insight into the Evolution of the Cordilleran Batholiths of Southwestern North America." Transnational Royal Society of Edinburgh 79 (1988): pages 105–121.
- Silver, L.T., and E. W. James. "Geologic Setting and Lithologic Column of the Cajon Pass Deep Drillhole," Geophysical Research Letters, Volume 15, Number 9, Supplement S, pages 941–944. (August 1988).
- Silver, L.T., and E.W. James, "Lithologic Column of the Arkoma Drillhole and its Relation to the Cajon Pass Deep Drillhole," Geophysical Research Letters, Volume 15, Number 9, Supplement S, pages 945–948. (August 1988).
- Silver, L.T., E.W. James, and B.W. Chappell. "Petrological and Geochemical Investigations at the Cajon Pass Deep Drillhole," Geophysical Research Letters, Volume 15, Number 9, Supplement S, pages 961–964. (August 1988).
- Silver, L. T. "Daughter-parent Isotope Systematics in U-Th-bearing Igneous Accessory Mineral Assemblages as Potential Indices of Metamorphic History: A Discussion of the Concept." The Geochemical Society, Special Publication 3 (1991): pages 391–407.
- Woodhead, J. A., G. R. Rossman, and L. T. Silver. "The Metamictization of Zircon: Radiation Dose-Dependent Structural Characteristics." Mineralogical Society of America 76 (1991): pages 74–82.
- Li, Y.-G., T. L. Henyey, and L. T. Silver. "Aspects of the Crustal Structure of the Western Mojave Desert, California, From Seismic Reflection and Gravity Data." Journal of Geologic Research, 97, B6 (1992): pages 8805–8816.
- Pratson, E.L., R.N. Anderson, R.E. Dove, M.Lyle, L.T. Silver, E.W. James and B.W. Chappell. "Geochemical Logging in the Cajon Pass Drillhole and its Application to a New Oxide, Igneous Rock Classification Scheme." Journal of Geologic Research, 97 B4 (1992): pages 5167–5180.
- Manduca, C.A., L.T. Silver, and H.P. Taylor. "87Sr/86Sr and 18O/16O Isotopic Systematics and Geochemistry of Granitoid Plutons Across a Steeply Dipping Boundary Between Contrasting Lithologic Blocks in Western Idaho." Contributions in Mineralogical Petrology, 109 (1992): pages 355–372.
- Kanamori, H. (Hiroo), Robert W. Clayton, and Leon T. Silver. Earthquake and Seismicity Research Using SCARLET And CEDAR: Final Technical Report, 1 December 1990 - 30 November 1992. Pasadena, California: Seismological Laboratory, California Institute of Technology, 1993.
- Manduca, C.A., M.A. Kunz, and L.T. Silver, "Emplacement and deformation history of the western margin of the Idaho batholith, Geological Society of America Bulletin, 105 (1993), pages 749–765.
- Silver, L.T. "Observations on the Extended Tectonic History of the Southern Sierra Nevada." Geological Society of America Joint Cordilleran and Rocky Mountain Section Meeting, Reno, Nevada. Geological Society of America. (1993).
- Nourse, Jonathan A., Thomas H. Anderson, and Leon T. Silver, "Tertiary metamorphic core complexes in Sonora, northwestern Mexico," Tectonics, Volume 13, Number 5 (October 1994), pp. 1161–1182.
- Huang, W.S., L.T. Silver, and H. Kanamori. "Evidence for possible horizontal faulting in southern California from earthquake mechanisms, Geology, Volume 24, Number 2 (February 1996), pages 123-126.
- Farley, K.A., R.A. Wolf, and L.T. Silver. "The effects of long alpha-stopping distances on (U-Th)/He ages," Geochimica et Cosmochimica Acta, Volume 60, Number 21 (November 1996), pages 4223–4229.
- Wolf, R.A, K.A. Farley, and L.T. Silver. "Helium diffusion and low-temperature thermochronometry of apatite," Geochimica et Cosmochimica Acta, Volume 60, Number 21 (November 1996), pages 4231–4240.
- Wolf, R.A., Farley, K.A., and Silver, L.T. "Assessment of (U-Th)/He thermochronometry: The low-temperature history of the San Jacinto mountains, California," Geology, Volume 25, Number 1 (January 1997), pages 65–68.
- Anderson, Thomas H., José Luis Rodríguez-Castañeda, and Leon T. Silver, "Jurassic rocks in Sonora, Mexico: Relations to the Mojave-Sonora megashear and its inferred northwestward extension," Geological Society of America Special Papers, 2005, 393, pages 51–95.
- Anderson, T.H., and L.T. Silver, 2005, "The Mojave-Sonora megashear—field and analytical studies leading to the conception and evolution of the hypothesis," in Anderson, T.H., Ed., The Mojave-Sonora Megashear Hypothesis: Development, Assessment, and Alternatives: Geological Society of America Special Paper, 393, pages 1–50.
