= South American Americans =

South American Americans are diaspora from South America who emigrate to the United States. Many of these people are also considered Hispanic and Latino Americans, but not all South Americans speak a Romance language, such as Guyanese Americans and Surinamese Americans who primarily speak English and Dutch, (Note: English is also spoken as the main language of the Falkland Islands but there is no statistics for communities of Falklanders in the United States.) French Guianese Americans are sometimes but not always considered Latino as they primarily speak French, other South American immigrants may speak a language indigenous to the continent or another immigrant language.

== Groups ==
- Argentine Americans
- Bolivian Americans
- Brazilian Americans
- Chilean Americans
- Colombian Americans
- Ecuadorian Americans
- French Guayanese Americans
- Guyanese Americans
- Paraguayan Americans
- Peruvian Americans
- Surinamese Americans
- Uruguayan Americans
- Venezuelan Americans

== See also ==
- Hispanic and Latino (ethnic categories)
- Panamanian Americans
- Latin American diaspora
