= Norton County (meteorite) =

Meteorite

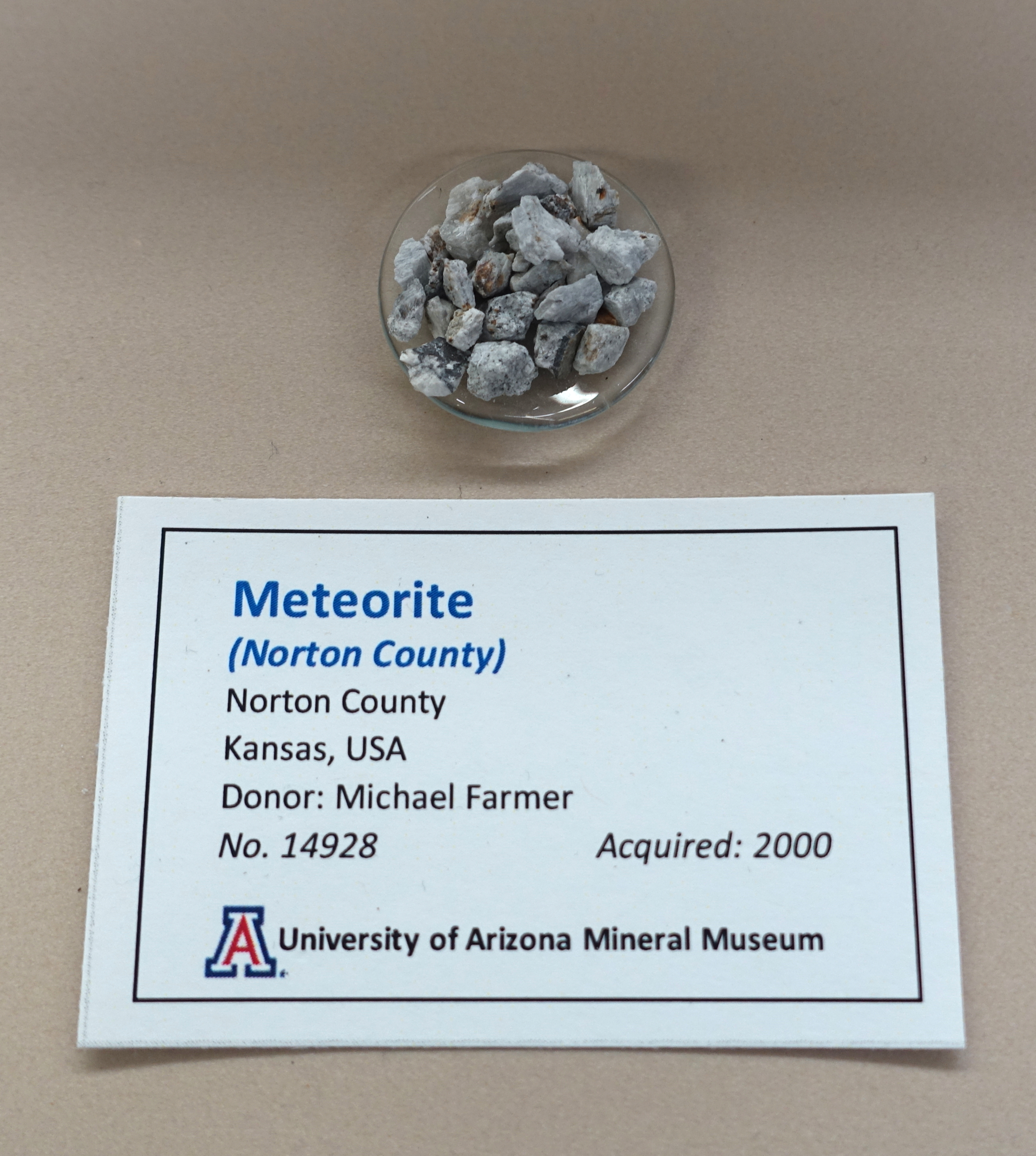
- Type: Achondrite
- Class: Asteroidal achondrite
- Group: Aubrite
- Country: United States
- Region: Kansas
- Coordinates: 39°41′N 99°52′W
- Observed fall: Yes
- Fall date: February 18, 1948
- TKW: 1100 kg

Norton County is an Aubrite meteorite that fell in 1948 in Kansas, United States.

== History ==
After a brilliant fireball and a loud noise, a very large shower of meteorites fell over a large area of Norton County (Kansas) and Furnas County (Nebraska) on February 18, 1948. On April 28, a research team from the University of New Mexico set out to identify and recover pieces of the meteorite. Everything that they recovered was either donated to or sold to the university.

== Composition and classification ==
Norton County is a Ca-poor aubrite fragmental breccia.

== Specimens ==
The main mass (about 1,070 kilograms (2,360 lb)) is the center piece of the meteorite display at the University of New Mexico in Albuquerque.

== See also ==
- Glossary of meteoritics
- Meteorite
