= Drew Linzer =

American political scientist

- Education: UCLA (Ph.D.)
- Occupation: Political scientist
- Website: votamatic.org/about-me/

Drew Linzer is an American political scientist who serves as the director and chief scientist at Civiqs. He was formerly an assistant professor of political science at Emory University. He is known for his psephology site "Votamatic". In 2014, Linzer ran the successful Daily Kos election forecast.
