= Civiqs =

Online polling and data analytics company

Civiqs is an online opinion polling and data analytics company founded by Daily Kos founder Markos Moulitsas in March 2018. It is a division of Kos Media, which Moulitsas also founded. The director of Civiqs is Drew Linzer. It is distinguished from other online polling firms by the large number of respondents to its polls, which it has recruited from across the United States through an online panel and asks questions on a daily basis. This allows Civiqs to monitor trends in public opinion over short periods of time, as well as across different demographic and geographic categories.
