= Opinion polling for the 2025 Norwegian parliamentary election =

In the run up to the 2025 Norwegian parliamentary election, various organisations carry out opinion polling to gauge voting intention in Norway. The date range for these opinion polls are from the 2021 Norwegian parliamentary election, held on 13 September, to the present day. Unlike most nations, Norway's constitution does not allow early elections before the expiration of the four-year term.

== Pollster reliability ==
The political polling industry in Norway can be generally considered reliable. The Absolute Total Raw Error 2021 ranged between 3.7 and 12.5, representing a relatively low error rate compared to the European average of 13.0. Pollster watchdog Europe Elects reviewed reports about Verian, Ipsos, Respons Analyse, InFact, Norstat, Sentio, Norfakta, and Opinion and found no documented conflict of interest.

== National poll results ==
This section includes national voter intention polls listed on the Poll of Polls website. The projected seat distribution for each poll, as listed on the website, is shown below the percentages. 85 seats are needed for a majority.

=== Averages ===
The following is the average of all polls published in September 2025.

Parties	Vote share	Seats
Labour Party	27.1%	52
Progress Party	21.0%	42
Conservative Party	14.4%	26
Green Party	6.2%	9
Red Party	6.0%	9
Socialist Left Party	6.0%	9
Centre Party	5.9%	9
Christian Democratic Party	4.7%	7
Liberal Party	4.3%	6
Others	4.4%	0
Blocs
Red bloc	51.2%	88
Blue bloc	44.4%	81

=== Graphical summary ===
Local regression trend line of poll results from 13 September 2021 to the present day. Each line corresponds to a political party.

=== 2025 ===
Polling execution				Parties												Blocs	
Polling firm	Fieldwork date	Sample size	Resp.	R	SV	MDG	Ap	Sp	V	KrF	H	FrP	INP	Others	Lead	Red	Blue
2025 election	8 Sep	—N/a	79.1	5.3; 9	5.6; 9	4.7; 8	28.0; 53	5.6; 9	3.7; 3	4.2; 7	14.6; 24	23.9; 47	0.6; 0	3.8; 0	4.3	49.2; 88	46.4; 81
Verian	1–6 Sep	3,500	–	5.3; 9	5.7; 9	6.4; 11	27.3; 52	6.0; 10	3.9; 3	4.7; 8	14.9; 25	21.3; 41	0.5; 0	4.2; 1	6.0	50.7; 91	44.8; 77
Respons Analyse	6 Sep	1,001	–	6.4; 10	5.8; 9	5.6; 8	29.5; 55	6.2; 9	4.5; 7	5.1; 8	14.9; 27	18.9; 36	–	3.1; 0	10.6	53.5; 91	43.4; 78
Verian	29 Aug – 5 Sep	2,843	–	5.3; 9	5.8; 10	5.9; 10	27.7; 51	5.8; 10	3.9; 3	4.2; 7	15.0; 26	21.0; 41	0.5; 0	4.3; 1	6.7	51.0; 91	44.1; 77
Norstat	1–4 Sep	2,000	–	6.9; 11	6.0; 9	7.2; 11	26.4; 50	6.2; 10	4.3; 7	4.2; 7	14.3; 25	20.4; 39	0.7; 0	3.4; 0	6.0	52.7; 91	43.2; 78
Verian	28 Aug – 4 Sep	2,350	–	5.1; 9	5.8; 10	5.9; 10	28.5; 53	5.7; 9	4.2; 7	3.9; 3	14.7; 25	21.0; 42	0.4; 0	4.7; 1	7.5	51.0; 91	43.8; 77
Verian	28 Aug – 3 Sep	2,301	–	5.5; 9	5.6; 9	6.4; 10	27.4; 51	5.8; 9	4.2; 6	4.2; 6	14.6; 26	21.6; 42	0.2; 0	4.5; 1	5.8	50.7; 88	44.6; 80
Opinion	27 Aug – 3 Sep	1,000	84.8	6.6; 11	8.0; 13	6.3; 10	27.5; 51	5.4; 9	4.2; 7	6.1; 10	13.3; 21	19.6; 37	–	3.2; 0	7.9	53.8; 94	43.0; 75
InFact	2 Sep	1,109	–	7.3; 12	5.4; 9	4.6; 8	26.5; 49	6.3; 10	5.1; 8	5.2; 8	13.6; 22	21.8; 43	0.6; 0	3.7; 0	4.7	50.1; 88	45.7; 81
Norfakta	1–2 Sep	1,004	85.0	5.6; 9	5.3; 8	6.0; 10	27.0; 51	7.0; 13	4.1; 6	5.8; 9	13.5; 21	20.8; 42	–	4.9; 0	6.2	50.9; 91	44.2; 78
Verian	27 Aug – 1 Sep	2,171	–	5.7; 10	6.3; 11	6.2; 10	26.2; 50	6.0; 10	4.0; 3	4.3; 7	15.2; 27	21.3; 40	0.2; 0	4.7; 1	4.9	50.4; 91	44.8; 77
Respons Analyse	27 Aug – 1 Sep	1,002	86.0	6.6; 9	6.2; 9	7.1; 10	26.6; 52	4.8; 7	4.6; 7	4.6; 7	14.8; 28	20.3; 40	0.7; 0	3.8; 0	6.3	51.3; 87	44.3; 82
Verian	27 Aug – 1 Sep	1,670	–	5.6; 8	6.5; 10	5.8; 9	25.6; 49	5.3; 8	4.0; 6	4.5; 7	15.6; 29	22.3; 42	0.1; 0	4.7; 1	3.3	48.8; 84	46.4; 84
Opinion	25–31 Aug	1,000	–	6.7; 11	5.2; 9	7.0; 12	26.7; 50	6.5; 11	4.6; 8	3.7; 3	13.4; 22	22.4; 43	0.5; 0	3.5; 0	4.3	52.1; 93	44.1; 76
Verian	25–29 Aug	1,577	–	5.5; 9	6.3; 11	6.0; 10	28.1; 52	5.9; 10	3.9; 3	4.5; 8	14.5; 26	20.5; 40	0.2; 0	4.4; 0	7.6	51.8; 92	43.4; 77
Verian	21–27 Aug	1,579	–	5.9; 10	6.1; 10	5.6; 9	29.3; 54	6.4; 11	3.2; 2	4.6; 8	15.7; 29	19.2; 36	0.3; 0	3.8; 0	10.1	53.3; 94	42.7; 75
Respons Analyse	20–25 Aug	1,004	83.0	5.8; 9	6.6; 10	5.0; 7	28.0; 53	6.8; 11	4.5; 7	4.5; 7	16.8; 29	18.5; 36	0.5; 0	3.1; 0	9.5	52.2; 90	44.3; 79
Verian	18–22 Aug	1,583	–	6.8; 11	5.6; 9	4.7; 8	27.0; 49	6.3; 11	3.7; 3	5.4; 9	15.8; 28	21.0; 40	0.6; 0	3.2; 1	6.0	50.4; 88	45.9; 80
Verian	18–21 Aug	1,189	–	7.3; 12	5.8; 10	4.8; 8	26.7; 50	6.0; 10	3.2; 2	5.2; 8	14.9; 24	22.8; 44	0.4; 0	3.0; 1	3.9	50.6; 90	46.1; 78
Norstat	7–19 Aug	15,200	–	6.4; 10	6.8; 11	4.6; 7	27.6; 51	5.6; 9	4.4; 7	4.7; 7	14.6; 26	21.2; 41	0.6; 0	3.5; 0	6.4	51.0; 88	44.9; 81
Respons Analyse	13–18 Aug	1,005	81.4	6.4; 10	6.3; 10	4.4; 7	24.8; 49	7.0; 13	5.3; 8	4.3; 7	14.5; 24	21.9; 41	0.7; 0	4.5; 0	2.9	48.9; 89	46.0; 80
Opinion	11–17 Aug	1,000	81.0	5.6; 10	5.5; 10	3.6; 3	24.8; 47	6.8; 13	3.9; 3	4.5; 8	17.9; 34	21.5; 41	1.2; 0	5.8; 0	3.3	46.3; 83	47.8; 86
Norstat	12–14 Aug	1,004	84.0	6.3; 10	7.1; 11	4.7; 8	28.2; 55	5.3; 9	3.8; 3	4.8; 8	14.6; 24	20.5; 41	0.9; 0	3.6; 0	7.7	51.6; 93	43.7; 76
InFact	12 Aug	1,142	–	5.7; 9	5.5; 9	3.7; 3	26.9; 54	5.6; 9	5.1; 8	5.6; 9	13.2; 22	23.9; 46	0.8; 0	4.2; 0	3.0	47.4; 84	47.8; 85
Respons Analyse	5–8 Aug	1,000	79.0	5.8; 10	7.1; 12	2.8; 1	28.0; 52	7.0; 12	5.1; 9	4.6; 8	15.2; 27	20.7; 38	0.7; 0	3.1; 0	7.3	50.7; 87	45.6; 82
Verian	4–8 Aug	1,193	–	6.3; 11	6.2; 10	3.5; 3	28.8; 53	4.9; 8	4.4; 7	4.6; 8	16.2; 28	20.7; 40	0.7; 0	3.7; 1	8.1	49.7; 85	45.9; 83
Norfakta	5–6 Aug	1,008	–	6.3; 11	6.2; 11	4.2; 7	26.8; 50	6.7; 12	5.6; 10	3.8; 3	14.4; 26	20.9; 39	1.5; 0	3.7; 0	5.9	50.2; 91	44.7; 78
Opinion	28 Jul – 3 Aug	1,000	78.0	5.8; 11	6.7; 13	3.2; 2	26.7; 50	6.2; 12	3.3; 3	3.1; 2	15.8; 30	23.6; 46	1.1; 0	4.6; 0	3.1	48.6; 89	45.8; 80
Norfakta	1–2 Jul	1,004	79.0	6.6; 11	8.9; 15	4.4; 7	26.9; 50	5.8; 10	5.0; 9	3.7; 3	15.7; 27	19.2; 37	–	3.6; 0	7.7	52.6; 93	43.6; 76
InFact	1 Jul	1,115	–	6.1; 11	7.9; 14	2.8; 2	25.2; 49	7.2; 12	4.4; 8	3.2; 2	14.8; 26	23.9; 45	0.8; 0	3.8; 0	1.3	49.2; 88	46.3; 81
Verian	24–30 Jun	986	–	5.1; 9	7.8; 14	3.3; 2	30.9; 59	6.0; 10	4.8; 8	2.6; 1	14.0; 24	21.5; 42	1.3; 0	2.8; 0	9.4	53.1; 89	42.9; 80
Opinion	10–16 Jun	1,000	72.0	7.3; 13	7.0; 12	2.3; 1	26.8; 53	5.4; 10	5.1; 9	3.3; 3	14.2; 25	22.8; 43	0.8; 0	5.0; 0	4.0	48.8; 89	45.4; 80
Norstat	10–14 Jun	1,007	–	5.6; 10	8.0; 14	2.1; 1	30.0; 55	5.3; 10	4.2; 8	3.3; 3	15.8; 28	21.3; 40	0.7; 0	3.9; 0	8.7	51.0; 90	44.6; 79
Norfakta	3–4 Jun	1,000	79.0	6.3; 11	5.5; 10	3.7; 3	27.3; 54	5.9; 10	4.6; 8	3.5; 3	18.2; 32	21.5; 42	–	3.4; 0	5.8	48.7; 84	47.8; 85
InFact	3 Jun	1076	–	6.1; 10	8.7; 14	2.2; 1	26.7; 50	5.5; 9	4.6; 8	4.0; 7	17.0; 30	21.0; 40	–	4.2; 0	5.7	49.2; 84	46.6; 85
Opinion	26–31 May	1,002	78.0	5.7; 9	5.5; 9	3.8; 3	30.9; 62	4.6; 7	5.3; 9	4.6; 7	13.9; 24	19.6; 39	–	6.1; 0	11.3	50.5; 90	43.4; 79
Verian	26–30 May	982	–	6.6; 12	5.0; 9	3.8; 3	31.6; 59	6.3; 12	2.7; 2	3.9; 3	17.5; 32	19.1; 36	–	3.5; 1	12.5	53.3; 95	43.2; 73
Opinion	12–19 May	1,000	75.0	4.3; 8	7.2; 13	2.7; 1	27.5; 50	6.2; 11	4.2; 8	3.4; 3	17.5; 33	21.0; 42	–	5.6; 0	6.5	47.9; 83	46.5; 86
Norstat	29 Apr – 16 May	15,200	–	5.4; 10	6.5; 12	3.1; 2	29.4; 54	5.5; 10	4.0; 7	3.5; 2	18.4; 33	20.6; 40	0.7; 0	3.0; 0	8.8	49.9; 88	46.5; 81
Respons Analyse	7–12 May	1,002	–	4.9; 7	6.9; 10	2.6; 1	29.3; 55	5.2; 8	4.8; 7	4.3; 7	18.6; 37	21.1; 35	0.6; 0	1.6; 0	8.2	46.3; 81	48.8; 88
Norfakta	6–7 May	1,005	78.0	6.0; 9	7.0; 11	2.5; 1	28.4; 54	6.1; 9	4.2; 7	4.2; 6	20.7; 38	17.5; 34	–	3.4; 0	7.7	50.0; 84	46.6; 85
InFact	6 May	1,073	–	5.5; 10	7.3; 14	2.8; 1	29.0; 54	5.8; 11	3.0; 2	3.0; 2	18.6; 35	21.2; 40	–	3.7; 0	7.8	50.4; 90	45.8; 79
Norstat	29 Apr – 5 May	996	–	5.5; 10	7.1; 12	3.1; 2	28.4; 54	5.3; 10	4.0; 7	2.3; 1	19.1; 33	20.3; 40	0.3; 0	4.6; 0	8.1	49.4; 88	45.7; 81
Opinion	28 Apr – 5 May	1,000	77.0	5.0; 9	6.5; 11	2.5; 1	26.0; 49	5.4; 9	4.6; 8	3.6; 3	18.5; 33	22.9; 46	–	3.9; 0	3.1	45.4; 79	49.6; 90
Verian	28 Apr – 2 May	990	–	5.4; 9	7.4; 12	2.5; 1	30.0; 54	5.8; 9	4.2; 7	4.6; 8	18.1; 32	19.0; 37	–	3.1; 0	11.0	51.1; 85	45.9; 84
Opinion	14–21 Apr	1,000	74.0	4.6; 9	6.6; 12	3.7; 3	30.4; 57	7.0; 12	3.5; 3	3.1; 2	17.4; 32	20.1; 38	–	3.7; 0	10.3	52.3; 94	44.1; 75
Respons Analyse	2–7 Apr	1,001	–	4.7; 9	6.4; 12	3.8; 3	30.1; 57	5.9; 11	3.9; 3	3.0; 2	20.4; 37	18.6; 35	0.9; 0	2.3; 0	9.7	50.9; 92	45.9; 77
Norstat	31 Mar – 7 Apr	994	–	3.7; 1	6.3; 12	3.3; 3	27.9; 55	7.2; 14	3.8; 3	3.2; 3	18.9; 37	21.0; 41	1.6; 0	3.1; 0	6.9	48.4; 85	46.9; 84
Norfakta	1–2 Apr	1,000	79.0	4.0; 7	6.7; 12	3.0; 2	24.0; 46	8.4; 15	5.3; 10	3.5; 3	21.6; 39	19.2; 35	1.1; 0	3.3; 0	2.4	46.1; 82	49.6; 87
InFact	1 Apr	1,081	–	5.4; 10	5.8; 11	3.1; 2	29.5; 56	6.6; 12	3.1; 2	3.3; 2	18.1; 34	21.3; 40	0.9; 0	3.0; 0	8.2	50.4; 91	45.8; 78
Verian	25–31 Mar	987	–	6.1; 11	6.4; 12	2.5; 1	29.4; 53	6.5; 12	4.1; 7	3.8; 3	19.5; 35	19.0; 35	–	2.7; 0	9.9	50.9; 89	46.4; 80
Opinion	24–31 Mar	1,000	76.0	5.3; 10	6.2; 11	2.5; 3	25.1; 48	5.3; 10	3.8; 3	3.1; 2	22.5; 41	21.1; 41	1.1; 0	3.9; 0	2.6	44.4; 82	50.5; 87
Opinion	10–12 Mar	1,000	79.0	6.0; 11	9.2; 16	2.8; 2	25.8; 49	4.7; 8	4.5; 8	3.7; 3	19.5; 35	19.7; 37	1.3; 0	2.8; 0	6.1	48.5; 86	47.4; 83
Respons Analyse	5–10 Mar	1,001	–	5.0; 8	7.1; 11	1.9; 1	27.4; 50	4.6; 7	5.4; 9	3.9; 3	20.2; 38	21.5; 42	0.6; 0	2.4; 0	5.9	46.0; 77	51.0; 92
Norstat	4–8 Mar	983	–	4.5; 7	6.4; 10	2.5; 1	30.1; 58	5.0; 8	4.4; 7	2.6; 3	18.1; 29	23.0; 46	0.8; 0	2.6; 0	7.1	48.5; 84	48.1; 85
Norfakta	4–5 Mar	1,001	81.0	5.0; 8	7.1; 11	2.5; 1	26.5; 52	4.8; 8	4.1; 7	2.6; 1	19.7; 36	24.3; 45	0.9; 0	2.5; 0	2.2	45.9; 80	50.7; 89
InFact	4 Mar	1,082	–	4.0; 7	6.6; 11	3.0; 2	29.5; 55	5.4; 9	4.3; 7	3.3; 3	16.4; 30	24.1; 45	0.7; 0	2.7; 0	5.4	48.5; 84	48.1; 85
Opinion	24 Feb – 3 Mar	1,003	77.0	4.2; 8	6.3; 11	3.7; 3	28.2; 55	5.4; 10	3.2; 2	2.6; 1	18.5; 33	24.8; 46	1.1; 0	2.0; 0	3.4	47.8; 87	49.1; 82
Verian	24–28 Feb	1,004	–	3.5; 1	7.9; 15	2.6; 1	29.5; 56	4.6; 9	4.1; 8	3.2; 3	19.3; 36	21.7; 40	1.1; 0	2.5; 0	7.8	48.1; 82	48.3; 87
Opinion	10–16 Feb	1,000	80.0	5.5; 10	7.2; 13	2.1; 1	26.6; 50	6.0; 11	3.9; 3	3.5; 3	19.1; 36	22.4; 42	0.5; 0	3.2; 0	4.2	47.4; 85	48.9; 84
Norstat	4–8 Feb	989	75.0	5.3; 9	7.4; 13	2.7; 1	28.7; 54	6.0; 11	3.1; 1	2.1; 3	16.2; 28	25.3; 49	0.8; 0	2.4; 0	3.4	50.1; 88	46.7; 81
Respons Analyse	4–6 Feb	1,000	–	4.9; 9	6.8; 12	1.6; 0	26.7; 48	6.8; 12	4.9; 9	3.0; 2	19.1; 33	23.6; 44	1.1; 0	1.5; 0	3.1	46.8; 81	50.6; 88
InFact	5 Feb	1,062	–	5.5; 10	6.5; 12	2.3; 1	30.7; 57	6.0; 11	3.4; 3	3.0; 1	15.6; 28	24.3; 46	0.8; 0	2.0; 0	6.4	51.0; 91	46.3; 78
Norfakta	4–5 Feb	1,003	77.0	5.7; 10	7.6; 13	2.7; 1	24.7; 47	6.1; 11	4.6; 8	3.0; 2	18.2; 32	24.7; 45	–	2.8; 0	Tie	46.8; 82	50.5; 87
Verian	4 Feb	1,000	76.0	3.7; 1	6.8; 13	2.4; 1	25.7; 49	6.9; 13	3.2; 3	3.2; 2	18.4; 35	26.9; 52	1.2; 0	1.6; 0	1.2	45.5; 77	51.7; 92
Respons Analyse	30 Jan – 3 Feb	1,000	–	5.9; 10	8.0; 14	1.9; 1	18.3; 34	7.5; 13	6.5; 11	3.7; 3	22.0; 39	24.2; 44	–	1.9; 0	2.2	41.6; 72	56.4; 97
Opinion	27 Jan – 3 Feb	1,002	72.0	6.1; 11	8.1; 14	3.8; 3	22.0; 42	5.2; 9	4.2; 8	3.0; 2	18.2; 33	25.0; 47	1.5; 0	3.0; 0	3.0	45.2; 79	50.4; 90
Verian	27–31 Jan	1,380	–	5.6; 10	8.4; 15	1.8; 1	19.8; 37	8.6; 15	4.2; 8	2.5; 1	18.9; 37	25.1; 47	1.5; 0	3.4; 1	5.3	44.2; 78	50.7; 90
InFact	30 Jan	1,171	–	4.5; 8	9.1; 16	3.4; 3	18.4; 36	8.2; 15	4.7; 9	3.0; 2	18.3; 33	26.1; 47	2.5; 0	1.8; 0	7.7	43.6; 78	52.1; 91
Opinion	13–20 Jan	1,000	77.0	5.0; 9	8.3; 16	3.1; 2	18.8; 37	5.5; 10	2.8; 2	3.5; 3	21.8; 41	26.2; 49	0.8; 0	4.3; 0	4.4	40.7; 74	54.3; 95
Norstat	8–13 Jan	992	–	5.9; 11	8.7; 16	3.3; 2	20.2; 38	4.9; 9	5.8; 10	3.9; 3	19.8; 35	23.7; 45	–	3.8; 0	3.5	43.0; 76	53.2; 93
Respons Analyse	8–13 Jan	1,000	–	5.2; 9	7.7; 14	3.8; 3	16.7; 32	6.1; 11	5.9; 10	3.1; 1	24.0; 44	24.5; 45	–	3.0; 0	0.5	39.5; 69	57.5; 100
Verian	6–10 Jan	994	–	5.4; 9	6.9; 12	3.6; 3	21.0; 42	5.6; 10	3.4; 2	3.9; 3	23.8; 42	24.3; 46	0.8; 0	1.3; 0	0.5	42.5; 76	55.4; 93
Norfakta	7–8 Jan	1,002	–	6.0; 11	8.1; 15	3.2; 2	18.4; 36	6.6; 12	4.3; 8	3.2; 2	23.2; 43	21.1; 40	–	5.9; 0	2.1	42.3; 76	51.8; 93
InFact	6 Jan	1,140	–	5.7; 10	7.5; 14	3.0; 2	20.6; 38	6.5; 12	4.5; 8	3.2; 2	21.0; 39	24.2; 44	1.5; 0	2.3; 0	3.2	43.3; 76	52.9; 93
Opinion	2–6 Jan	1,005	–	5.7; 10	8.7; 16	2.8; 1	18.1; 33	6.3; 12	4.7; 9	3.2; 2	21.6; 39	25.0; 47	1.5; 0	2.4; 0	3.4	41.6; 72	54.5; 97
2021 election	13 Sep	—N/a	77.1	4.7; 8	7.6; 13	3.9; 3	26.3; 48	13.5; 28	4.6; 8	3.8; 3	20.4; 36	11.6; 21	0.3; 0	3.3; 1	5.9	56.1; 100	40.4; 68

=== 2024 ===
Polling firm	Fieldwork date	Sample size	Resp.	R	SV	MDG	Ap	Sp	V	KrF	H	FrP	INP	Others	Lead
Norstat	10–14 Dec	1,000	–	6.8	6.9	3.9	16.8	4.7	4.8	4.2	20.7	27.7	–	3.7	7.0
Respons Analyse	4–9 Dec	1,002	–	6.4	9.4	2.3	18.9	5.3	6.1	3.5	20.3	23.9	–	3.3	3.6
Opinion	3–9 Dec	1,000	–	5.7	9.4	3.1	17.7	4.9	5.8	4.0	20.5	25.3	–	3.4	4.8
Norstat	2–9 Dec	1,000	–	5.5	11.0	3.5	14.2	3.8	4.7	4.3	21.5	27.4	–	4.0	5.9
Norfakta	3–4 Dec	1,001	80.0	5.3	8.7	2.9	18.1	5.4	4.6	4.2	22.9	23.7	0.4	3.9	0.8
InFact	3 Dec	1,080	–	5.0	9.0	3.6	18.1	6.7	4.6	3.9	19.3	26.3	1.4	2.1	7.0
Opinion	26 Nov – 2 Dec	999	75.0	6.1	10.7	2.9	17.6	5.3	5.9	3.3	21.0	24.4	1.2	1.7	3.4
Verian	25–29 Nov	995	–	5.5	9.9	2.4	16.5	6.1	6.1	3.8	23.0	24.1	–	2.6	1.1
Norstat	12–16 Nov	1,000	–	5.3	9.3	3.5	17.5	5.4	4.4	2.9	21.0	25.3	2.0	3.4	4.3
Respons Analyse	6–11 Nov	1,003	–	5.6	9.4	3.0	19.0	6.8	6.3	3.7	20.9	22.4	–	2.9	1.5
Opinion	5–11 Nov	1,000	71.0	6.0	9.1	3.1	18.7	6.7	5.6	3.1	22.4	21.3	–	2.9	1.1
Norfakta	5–6 Nov	1,000	78.0	4.8	9.3	3.3	20.9	7.4	4.4	2.6	22.4	21.3	0.7	2.9	1.1
Opinion	30 Oct – 4 Nov	1,000	69.0	7.1	8.5	3.5	19.4	5.8	3.8	3.1	24.1	20.1	1.5	3.2	4.0
InFact	4 Nov	1,124	–	7.0	8.4	4.3	17.7	6.2	5.1	3.5	20.3	24.2	1.5	1.9	3.9
Verian	28 Oct – 1 Nov	999	–	5.7	9.1	3.4	17.7	7.7	6.1	2.8	25.7	19.7	1.0	1.2	6.0
Norstat	15–19 Oct	992	–	6.2	9.0	3.5	19.3	4.9	6.0	2.4	22.7	22.0	1.4	2.7	0.7
Respons Analyse	10–14 Oct	1,000	–	4.7	8.3	3.5	20.7	5.3	6.3	3.5	25.7	19.2	1.4	1.4	5.0
Opinion	1–7 Oct	1,000	71.0	5.6	10.6	2.8	18.0	4.9	5.5	4.3	23.1	22.5	–	2.7	0.6
Verian	30 Sep – 4 Oct	1,000	–	5.8	8.7	3.7	22.2	5.7	4.6	3.1	24.5	17.9	0.5	3.3	2.3
InFact	3 Oct	1,051	–	6.4	6.7	3.7	20.2	6.9	5.0	3.6	20.1	23.3	2.1	1.9	3.1
Norfakta	1–2 Oct	1,001	–	5.3	10.2	3.7	20.3	6.9	5.4	2.5	24.0	16.6	1.6	3.5	3.6
Opinion	23–30 Sep	1,000	70.0	7.0	8.1	3.5	18.5	5.9	6.0	3.6	23.6	20.3	1.6	1.9	3.3
Norstat	17–21 Sep	993	–	5.0	8.4	4.0	20.2	5.1	4.8	2.5	25.5	19.5	–	4.9	5.3
Respons Analyse	4–9 Sep	1,000	–	5.1	10.6	2.6	21.9	5.0	5.0	2.9	23.6	19.8	1.7	1.8	1.7
Opinion	3–9 Sep	1,000	74.0	5.8	8.6	2.6	20.2	6.0	5.6	2.0	23.7	20.2	2.8	2.4	3.5
Norfakta	3–4 Sep	1,000	76.0	5.4	9.5	3.2	20.8	7.5	4.8	3.4	25.1	17.2	0.9	2.2	4.3
InFact	3–4 Sep	1,168	–	5.5	8.2	3.9	21.4	6.1	4.2	3.7	21.0	21.9	2.3	4.1	0.5
Opinion	27 Aug – 2 Sep	1,000	74.0	6.7	8.8	3.2	21.1	5.9	5.6	2.5	25.4	16.8	1.2	2.5	4.3
Verian	26–30 Aug	1,000	–	6.0	8.6	3.3	18.6	6.2	5.4	3.6	27.6	16.9	2.0	4.1	9.0
Respons Analyse	7–12 Aug	1,000	–	5.7	10.0	2.3	22.0	5.4	5.3	3.3	24.5	17.5	1.2	2.8	2.5
Opinion	6–12 Aug	1,000	70.0	6.4	10.2	3.3	19.8	6.0	4.1	4.0	27.1	14.7	–	4.4	7.3
Norstat	5–10 Aug	992	–	6.1	7.9	3.9	20.0	6.4	5.8	3.6	24.5	18.0	1.0	2.9	4.5
Norstat	5–10 Aug	987	–	5.8	8.6	3.2	20.6	7.6	4.9	4.3	25.2	16.0	1.5	2.3	4.6
Verian	5–9 Aug	1,000	–	3.8	10.3	4.5	21.1	5.9	5.0	4.7	24.4	16.3	1.7	2.3	3.3
InFact	8 Aug	1,110	–	6.1	7.6	4.1	22.0	6.0	4.6	3.3	22.2	18.5	2.9	2.6	0.2
Norfakta	6–7 Aug	1,001	77.0	5.6	11.3	4.2	18.5	6.3	4.8	3.3	26.4	15.4	1.4	3.1	7.9
Opinion	30 Jul – 1 Aug	1,000	76.0	5.9	7.0	3.1	21.2	5.8	6.9	4.6	26.9	15.0	1.4	2.2	5.7
InFact	4 Jul	1,064	–	5.4	8.4	3.7	20.4	5.1	5.9	4.2	22.4	20.7	1.7	2.1	1.7
Norfakta	2–4 Jul	1,002	77.0	6.0	9.0	3.7	20.6	4.6	4.9	4.1	27.4	13.0	1.2	5.5	6.8
Verian	24–28 Jun	998	–	4.9	11.0	3.8	22.4	4.5	5.9	3.5	24.8	15.7	1.5	2.0	2.4
Norstat	11–15 Jun	993	–	6.1	8.6	4.7	22.0	4.5	6.5	2.8	25.0	16.8	–	3.0	3.0
Respons Analyse	5–10 Jun	1,000	73.0	5.5	8.5	3.0	19.9	7.6	5.9	3.7	26.2	17.5	0.6	1.6	6.3
Opinion	4–10 Jun	1,000	75.0	5.1	10.8	3.6	19.9	7.2	6.5	3.3	19.8	19.3	–	3.6	0.1
Norfakta	4–5 Jun	1,002	80.0	8.0	9.9	3.4	18.9	7.5	5.8	3.5	23.4	15.7	1.4	2.5	4.5
InFact	4 Jun	1,096	–	6.0	8.8	3.0	18.9	5.7	5.8	3.9	25.4	17.8	2.5	2.2	6.5
Verian	27–31 May	998	–	8.9	11.5	2.7	18.6	5.4	4.8	3.7	25.5	15.9	0.8	2.0	6.9
Norstat	21–25 May	–	–	3.8	9.6	3.3	20.3	6.6	6.4	4.2	23.4	17.3	1.0	4.2	3.1
Norstat	14–21 May	992	–	5.7	9.3	3.8	19.6	5.2	6.5	4.8	23.6	18.5	–	3.1	4.0
Norfakta	7–8 May	1,001	78.0	4.9	10.5	3.3	17.8	6.6	6.6	3.4	26.5	15.4	1.4	2.1	8.7
Respons Analyse	2–7 May	1,000	–	5.8	8.7	3.6	20.3	7.5	5.3	4.0	25.9	15.1	1.6	2.2	5.6
Opinion	30 Apr – 6 May	1,000	–	4.6	9.7	3.5	17.3	5.9	5.8	4.4	28.0	17.8	1.5	1.5	10.2
Verian	29 Apr – 6 May	1,049	–	5.0	10.2	3.1	21.3	5.2	6.8	3.8	24.9	16.5	2.3	1.0	3.6
InFact	2 May	1,070	–	5.1	8.9	4.4	20.0	6.1	4.4	4.4	23.5	18.8	2.6	2.0	3.5
Opinion	23–29 Apr	1,000	74.0	5.0	7.7	4.2	22.6	5.6	5.5	3.5	25.4	17.0	2.1	1.5	2.8
Opinion	9–15 Apr	1,000	73.5	5.9	10.9	2.8	19.3	6.0	7.3	3.0	22.2	16.8	2.7	3.1	2.9
Respons Analyse	3–8 Apr	1,001	–	6.9	8.9	4.1	21.2	5.7	5.5	3.3	28.4	13.4	1.6	1.0	7.2
Norfakta	2–8 Apr	999	–	4.9	10.6	3.6	21.0	5.5	5.2	4.4	28.3	13.0	1.1	2.5	7.3
Norstat	2–6 Apr	991	–	5.9	10.4	4.0	17.1	6.9	4.6	4.1	25.5	17.6	1.6	2.4	7.9
Opinion	2–5 Apr	1,001	71.0	4.2	9.4	3.4	19.0	5.3	5.2	3.3	30.5	15.3	2.7	1.8	11.5
InFact	4 Apr	1,130	–	5.7	10.2	3.4	18.4	5.4	5.7	4.5	25.4	15.3	3.4	2.5	7.0
Verian	2–4 Apr	1,003	–	5.0	9.4	3.6	20.5	8.6	5.3	2.9	24.6	14.9	1.1	2.0	4.1
Respons Analyse	6–11 Mar	1,000	–	5.6	10.2	3.6	17.9	6.1	5.8	4.4	28.5	14.4	2.2	1.3	10.6
Norstat	5–9 Mar	997	–	6.2	10.1	3.5	18.2	6.7	6.1	4.0	27.0	15.2	1.1	2.0	8.8
Norfakta	5–6 Mar	1,001	80.0	5.0	9.4	4.4	18.6	5.9	6.4	4.8	25.7	14.8	1.3	3.7	7.1
InFact	4 Mar	1,095	–	6.7	9.2	4.1	17.8	7.2	5.7	3.5	26.0	15.7	2.5	1.6	8.2
Opinion	27 Feb – 4 Mar	1,000	72.0	5.8	10.9	4.9	18.8	5.4	5.8	2.6	24.9	16.3	1.4	3.1	6.1
Verian	26 Feb – 1 Mar	999	–	5.6	9.1	3.3	19.5	6.2	5.8	3.0	26.9	13.8	2.9	3.9	7.4
Opinion	19–24 Feb	985	–	5.8	10.1	4.5	16.8	7.9	5.5	4.2	26.7	13.3	2.7	2.6	9.9
Norstat	19–24 Feb	985	74.0	6.2	10.6	4.0	18.6	6.4	4.9	3.6	25.1	16.4	1.8	2.4	6.5
Respons Analyse	7–12 Feb	1,001	–	4.8	11.0	3.7	19.1	5.1	5.8	4.1	27.4	14.7	2.9	1.4	8.3
Opinion	6–12 Feb	1,000	69.0	5.2	10.0	3.7	17.8	7.7	5.8	4.2	29.5	13.6	1.3	1.2	11.7
Norstat	6–11 Feb	1,000	–	5.3	9.5	3.6	17.8	6.8	6.6	3.7	26.5	14.3	2.6	3.3	8.7
Norfakta	6–7 Feb	1,010	–	4.3	9.1	2.7	20.5	6.5	5.7	3.5	27.6	13.7	3.0	3.3	7.1
Opinion	29 Jan – 5 Feb	1,000	71.0	4.6	10.0	4.3	17.6	4.6	5.9	4.7	31.2	11.8	3.5	1.9	13.6
Verian	29 Jan – 3 Feb	997	–	5.8	8.7	3.1	22.0	6.6	6.1	4.0	27.6	11.6	2.7	1.8	5.6
InFact	1 Feb	1,023	–	5.7	10.3	4.0	18.8	5.8	5.9	4.2	26.8	14.6	2.3	1.7	8.0
Norstat	10–13 Jan	989	–	4.9	11.4	3.3	19.4	5.7	6.0	3.7	26.8	12.1	3.3	3.3	7.4
Opinion	2–8 Jan	1,000	69.0	6.2	11.1	3.6	19.4	6.2	4.8	3.8	26.0	12.8	3.7	2.5	6.6
Verian	2–7 Jan	987	–	4.8	10.7	2.9	19.2	6.9	7.2	3.5	27.3	11.4	4.5	1.6	8.1
Respons Analyse	3–8 Jan	1,000	–	5.4	10.7	3.5	20.5	7.6	5.9	4.1	26.2	13.5	1.7	0.9	5.7
Norfakta	3–4 Jan	1,003	81.0	4.3	10.6	3.5	19.0	6.6	5.9	4.1	25.2	14.2	3.4	3.2	6.2
InFact	3 Jan	1,087	–	5.6	9.1	3.6	18.5	7.8	5.3	4.6	23.5	14.5	6.1	1.5	5.0
2021 election	13 Sep	—N/a	77.1	4.7	7.6	3.9	26.3	13.5	4.6	3.8	20.4	11.6	0.3	3.3	5.9

=== 2023 ===
Polling firm	Fieldwork date	Sample size	Resp.	R	SV	MDG	Ap	Sp	V	KrF	H	FrP	INP	Others	Lead
InFact	13 Dec (Note: Date of publication of poll; fieldwork date unknown.)	1,161	–	5.7	9.7	3.5	18.9	7.8	6.0	3.3	24.5	14.2	4.7	1.7	5.6
Respons Analyse	12 Dec	1,000	–	4.9	11.8	3.6	18.4	6.3	5.7	4.2	26.8	12.4	4.2	1.7	8.4
Norstat	4–8 Dec	987	74.0	6.0	12.0	4.8	17.9	6.5	5.5	3.7	27.3	12.2	2.9	1.2	9.4
Norfakta	5–6 Dec	1,005	78.0	5.4	10.8	3.7	17.7	5.5	5.9	3.8	25.0	16.0	3.4	2.8	7.3
Opinion	28 Nov – 4 Dec	1,000	72.0	4.9	9.9	3.3	19.9	7.4	6.1	3.8	23.9	14.2	3.5	3.2	4.0
Norstat	27 Nov – 2 Dec	1,000	–	4.8	11.4	3.9	18.6	6.1	4.0	4.7	26.3	13.6	4.1	2.5	7.7
Verian	27 Nov – 1 Dec	989	–	6.4	10.8	2.6	20.9	7.9	4.7	3.1	25.4	11.0	4.4	2.8	4.5
Opinion	21–25 Nov	1,000	74.0	6.8	10.2	4.0	17.6	5.0	7.2	4.3	25.5	13.1	3.9	2.5	7.9
Respons Analyse	8–13 Nov	1,000	–	5.4	9.3	3.5	18.4	6.4	6.8	4.7	26.9	13.3	3.6	1.7	8.5
Norfakta	7–8 Nov	1,038	80.0	4.9	10.3	2.9	22.2	6.5	5.5	3.7	27.2	11.1	3.5	2.2	5.0
Opinion	31 Oct – 7 Nov	1,000	72.0	3.9	8.2	4.0	21.0	5.3	6.6	3.6	27.9	13.2	3.4	3.0	6.9
Verian	30 Oct – 3 Nov	1,000	–	5.6	9.9	4.7	16.8	6.2	6.2	4.7	27.5	12.1	4.3	2.1	10.7
InFact	2 Nov	1,038	–	5.9	9.3	4.4	19.8	5.0	5.0	3.9	24.1	14.8	5.3	2.6	4.3
Opinion	24–30 Oct	1,000	73.0	4.9	11.0	4.4	18.0	5.9	5.8	3.8	26.3	13.3	3.7	2.9	8.3
Norstat	23–30 Oct	994		4.2	10.6	4.6	20.2	5.6	6.4	4.0	24.6	12.9	4.3	2.8	4.4
Opinion	3–9 Oct	1,000	–	4.7	9.9	3.8	19.3	7.6	5.2	3.6	25.1	13.3	–	7.5	5.8
InFact	2 Oct	1,045	–	5.2	8.6	4.0	20.7	5.8	5.3	4.2	25.0	14.0	4.0	3.3	4.3
Norfakta	3–4 Oct	1,004	82.0	5.0	10.5	3.0	21.0	5.5	5.6	4.1	26.5	12.8	4.1	1.9	5.5
Opinion	26 Sep – 2 Oct	1,000	79.0	6.6	9.1	4.1	20.2	6.0	6.0	3.3	25.6	12.3	4.8	2.1	5.4
Verian	2 Oct	–	–	4.9	8.7	3.8	20.6	6.1	6.5	4.1	27.0	12.6	4.3	1.5	6.4
Norstat	21–27 Sep	992	–	5.3	8.7	3.8	21.0	6.6	5.8	3.0	27.6	11.6	3.2	0.3	6.6
Respons Analyse	20–22 Sep	1,000	–	5.6	8.7	4.3	20.8	7.7	7.2	2.9	27.2	11.2	2.6	1.8	6.4
Respons Analyse	4–7 Sep	1,001	–	4.6	7.4	4.9	20.3	7.1	4.8	4.1	29.0	12.4	2.7	2.7	8.7
Norfakta	5–6 Sep	1,005	81.0	4.1	8.5	4.0	19.8	6.9	6.2	3.4	27.8	13.1	2.2	4.1	8.0
Opinion	4–6 Sep	1,000	73.0	4.5	7.2	3.7	20.7	6.6	5.1	3.9	28.3	13.0	4.5	2.7	7.6
InFact	5 Sep	1,053	–	5.5	8.8	4.3	19.3	5.5	5.0	4.7	26.0	14.3	3.6	3.0	6.7
Norstat	29 Aug – 1 Sep	992	72.3	6.0	10.2	3.7	17.5	6.8	5.4	3.5	27.5	13.8	2.1	3.4	10.0
Opinion	24–30 Aug	1,000	–	4.6	10.0	3.3	20.9	4.7	4.6	3.7	30.0	12.8	2.6	2.7	9.1
Norstat	5 Sep	–	–	5.7	9.3	4.4	18.4	5.5	5.0	3.2	29.1	14.1	1.9	3.4	10.7
Verian	23–28 Aug	1,300	–	5.5	8.4	4.0	18.1	5.4	5.1	3.6	29.9	12.4	4.0	3.6	11.8
Opinion	8–15 Aug	1,001	–	5.5	9.4	3.6	18.0	5.7	4.6	3.4	30.3	14.2	–	5.3	12.3
Norstat	8–14 Aug	985	71.2	5.3	9.6	3.2	17.4	6.6	4.5	3.1	31.1	12.7	2.1	4.4	13.7
Respons Analyse	9–14 Aug	1,002	–	5.0	7.4	4.7	19.8	7.8	4.4	4.3	30.6	12.1	2.5	1.4	10.8
Norstat	8–14 Aug	1,000	–	4.1	8.1	4.2	19.1	6.3	6.3	3.9	28.3	12.2	4.8	2.7	9.2
Opinion	1–7 Aug	1,000	68.0	4.9	8.8	5.0	17.7	6.0	3.1	3.6	33.0	11.7	2.7	3.4	15.3
Kantar	31 Jul – 4 Aug	986	–	3.8	9.0	3.2	17.8	7.5	5.2	2.5	31.5	12.4	3.0	4.1	13.7
InFact	3 Aug	1,039	–	5.4	8.7	3.2	19.1	7.3	6.0	2.9	26.8	13.8	4.6	2.1	7.7
Norfakta	1–2 Aug	1,001	76.0	5.6	9.1	3.8	18.8	4.9	4.8	4.3	31.8	12.2	2.2	2.5	13.0
InFact	6 Jul	1,001	–	4.9	6.8	3.9	20.8	7.5	3.8	3.8	29.0	14.6	1.4	3.5	8.2
Norfakta	4–5 Jul	1,004	75.0	5.8	8.0	2.8	18.5	6.5	5.7	3.1	30.5	13.8	3.0	2.4	12.0
Norstat	12–17 Jun	987	–	5.1	7.6	3.6	20.1	6.7	4.7	3.9	30.9	11.5	3.2	2.7	10.8
Respons Analyse	7–12 Jun	1,000	76.3	6.3	9.2	3.7	19.8	5.7	4.8	3.0	32.1	10.7	3.3	1.4	12.3
Norfakta	6–7 Jun	1,002	–	5.8	7.9	3.3	18.4	6.5	4.0	4.1	31.6	13	1.3	4.1	13.2
InFact	5 Jun	1,005	–	4.7	8.4	3.6	19.9	6.2	4.4	4.4	29.8	11.7	3.8	3.1	9.9
Opinion	30 May – 5 Jun	1,000	68.0	5.0	8.2	3.8	17.6	5.7	4.5	4.5	31.8	14.1	–	4.9	14.2
Kantar	31 May – 2 Jun	984	–	7.2	8.2	3.6	18.0	6.5	4.5	4.1	31.7	11.4	2.3	2.5	13.7
Norstat	24–30 May	991	68.5	6.6	7.4	3.2	18.7	7.1	4.6	2.9	31	13.4	3.3	1.8	12.3
Opinion	23–30 May	1,006	71.0	8.6	8.3	3.8	16.3	5.2	4.5	3.1	32.1	13.2	2.2	2.6	15.8
Norstat	15–19 May	1,000	–	5.3	9.1	3.8	18.4	5.2	4.7	3.4	34.1	11.9	1.6	2.4	15.7
Respons Analyse	3–8 May	1,000	–	6.3	7.6	3.1	19.5	6.5	4.7	3.9	31.8	14.2	–	2.4	12.3
Opinion	2–8 May	1,000	–	7.0	8.1	3.7	17.9	6.5	4.2	4.1	30.3	13.4	3.0	1.7	12.4
Norfakta	2–3 May	1,000	75.0	5.3	8.4	3.6	17.0	5.9	5.5	4.2	31.8	12.3	2.6	3.4	14.8
InFact	2 May	1,005	–	5.1	9.1	4.9	18.8	6.5	3.7	4.2	32.1	10.9	1.8	3.0	13.3
Kantar	24–30 Apr	2,000	77.3	5.7	8.5	3.6	19.8	6.3	4.7	4.1	31.2	10.6	2.4	3.2	11.4
Opinion	25–29 Apr	1,000	–	5.9	8.9	3.8	17.7	5.5	4.7	4.4	29.8	12.5	–	6.8	12.1
Norstat	24–29 Apr	975	–	5.4	8.5	3.3	20.1	6.8	3.7	3.8	32.6	10.6	1.9	3.3	12.5
Respons Analyse	12–17 Apr	1,000	–	5.2	8.0	4.2	18.6	5.6	4.6	3.9	31.8	12.8	2.5	2.8	13.2
Norstat	12–15 Apr	991	–	5.4	8.8	4.8	19.3	5.0	5.4	2.8	31.6	9.8	3.6	3.6	12.3
Norfakta	11–12 Apr	1,002	–	5.3	10.0	3.4	18.6	6.3	4.9	4.0	30.8	12.3	0.9	3.5	12.2
InFact	11 Apr	1,000	–	6.2	8.0	3.2	17.6	5.7	5.5	4.6	32.2	11.1	2.1	3.8	14.6
Opinion	3–4 Apr	1,000	68.0	6.6	6.8	3.6	16.9	5.8	4.6	3.9	32.2	14.8	–	4.8	15.3
Kantar	27–31 Mar	977	–	6.4	9.9	4.0	18.0	5.6	4.3	3.1	30.6	12.6	1.5	4.1	12.6
Norstat	22–29 Mar	992	72.4	5.6	9.6	2.8	17.1	5.7	4.9	3.7	33.8	10.6	2.8	3.4	16.7
Opinion	21–27 Mar	–	–	6.1	8.1	2.9	16.2	5.8	5.4	4.0	34.2	12.5	2.8	2.1	18.0
Norstat	13–20 Mar	988	–	6.3	10.2	2.9	17.0	5.5	5.0	4.0	34.6	11.4	–	3.1	17.6
Respons Analyse	8–13 Mar	1,000	–	6.3	9.1	4.0	18.1	6.3	5.5	3.9	30.9	10.0	3.5	1.9	12.8
Norfakta	7–8 Mar	1,000	74.0	5.4	10.6	3.3	16.5	7.2	3.6	3.7	32.9	11.0	2.2	3.6	16.4
Opinion	28 Feb – 6 Mar	999	70.0	5.0	7.9	2.4	15.5	6.2	4.8	4.1	36.9	12.2	–	5.1	21.4
Kantar	27 Feb – 3 Mar	992	–	5.7	9.4	3.5	16.5	6.6	4.7	4.3	29.9	14.4	–	5.0	13.4
Norstat	23–28 Feb	985	71.0	7.0	9.0	3.6	18.5	7.2	5.1	3.5	30.6	11.8	1.8	1.9	12.1
Opinion	21–27 Feb	1,053	70.0	6.9	9.2	3.4	16.0	6.0	3.9	3.4	32.5	13.6	2.1	2.9	16.5
Respons Analyse	8–13 Feb	1,000	–	6.3	9.5	2.3	18.6	5.3	4.8	3.5	32.4	12.8	–	4.5	13.8
Norfakta	7–8 Feb	1,001	73.0	6.5	6.9	2.2	21.0	5.4	4.3	4.6	34.6	10.9	–	3.8	13.6
InFact	6 Feb	1,032	–	6.9	8.2	3.5	21.2	5.6	3.1	3.3	30.8	12.3	2.1	3.0	9.6
Opinion	31 Jan – 6 Feb	992	68.0	7.9	8.8	3.6	16.8	5.1	4.1	3.9	31.9	12.8	–	5.1	15.1
Kantar	30 Jan – 5 Feb	977	–	6.8	10.0	3.8	16.9	7.4	4.6	2.4	29.0	13.1	–	6.0	12.1
Norstat	25–31 Jan	986	73.1	6.0	8.8	4.0	17.5	5.4	4.9	3.5	31.0	14.5	–	4.3	13.5
Opinion	24–27 Jan	1,003	–	6.4	8.0	4.3	17.4	5.5	5.0	4.0	31.9	12.6	–	5.0	14.5
InFact	11 Jan	1,044	–	6.8	7.8	3.4	20.5	6.0	3.9	4.2	29.1	13.1	2.0	3.3	8.6
Respons Analyse	4–9 Jan	1,001	–	5.8	8.7	3.9	19.2	6.9	4.8	2.8	30.1	13.1	2.1	2.6	10.9
Opinion	3–9 Jan	1,000	69.9	6.2	7.6	2.6	18.5	7.1	3.4	3.6	33.5	12.4	–	5.1	15.0
Kantar	3–6 Jan	990	–	6.3	8.7	3.2	19.5	6.2	4.6	3.0	30.4	13.9	2.5	1.8	10.9
Opinion	3–4 Jan	967	67.0	6.9	9.5	4.1	17.7	6.3	4.0	2.4	31.0	13.2	1.4	3.5	13.3
Norfakta	3–4 Jan	1,006	76.0	6.5	9.4	4.2	19.1	4.5	4.0	3.9	31.3	12.5	1.5	3.0	12.2
Norstat	27 Dec – 2 Jan	955	73.8	5.4	8.4	4.0	19.4	5.9	5.1	2.6	30.9	11.9	1.2	5.0	11.5
2021 election	13 Sep	—N/a	77.1	4.7	7.6	3.9	26.3	13.5	4.6	3.8	20.4	11.6	0.3	3.3	5.9

=== 2022 ===
Polling firm	Fieldwork date	Sample size	Resp.	R	SV	MDG	Ap	Sp	V	KrF	H	FrP	Others	Lead
Norstat	13–17 Dec	947	–	7.7	8.8	4.1	14.6	3.8	4.2	3.1	35.6	14.2	3.9	21.0
Ipsos	12–14 Dec	889	81.0	6.3	9.6	4.1	19.9	6.2	4.6	3.4	29.1	11.8	5.0	14.6
Respons Analyse	7–12 Dec	1001	–	7.2	9.3	2.6	18.2	4.5	3.6	3.7	32.8	13.4	4.7	14.6
Sentio	6–10 Dec	1000	–	7.5	9.3	4.1	17.7	5.9	4.6	2.8	32.8	10.2	5.1	15.1
Norfakta	6–7 Dec	1007	78.0	7.2	9.5	3.6	16.3	7.1	4.5	3.3	32.8	11.6	4.1	16.5
Opinion	29 Nov – 5 Dec	967	68.0	6.7	9.5	3.2	18.1	5.4	5.8	3.4	32.7	12.2	2.9	14.6
Kantar	28 Nov – 2 Dec	980	–	7.4	8.9	4.1	19.8	5.1	5.6	2.9	30.9	10.6	4.8	11.1
Norstat	22–27 Nov	947	–	7.3	8.6	3.9	17.1	5.9	4.6	3.4	30.1	12.8	6.1	13.0
Opinion	22–24 Nov	951	67.0	9.5	8.1	3.9	17.4	3.5	3.4	3.7	31.6	13.3	5.7	14.2
Ipsos	21–23 Nov	945	–	5.9	8.4	3.3	19.8	4.8	6.0	3.1	29.8	14.7	4.2	10.0
Norstat	15–19 Nov	954	–	6.3	9.2	3.3	15.4	5.0	4.9	2.8	33.6	12.7	6.8	18.2
Sentio	8–14 Nov	1,000	–	4.7	10.0	4.8	16.7	4.5	4.4	4.6	31.6	13.4	5.4	14.9
Respons Analyse	5–10 Nov	1,000	–	6.1	8.5	3.9	18.5	6.6	5.0	3.3	32.0	11.9	4.2	13.5
Opinion	1–7 Nov	967	68.0	7.5	8.7	3.4	16.9	5.3	3.1	4.5	32.3	13.8	4.4	15.4
Norfakta	1–4 Nov	1,011	78.0	6.9	7.3	4.0	20.5	6.0	5.3	3.3	29.4	13.1	4.2	8.9
Kantar	24–31 Oct	1,178	–	7.8	8.6	3.8	19.1	6.2	4.6	3.7	28.6	12.1	5.5	9.5
Norstat	25–30 Oct	945	–	5.9	8.4	3.7	18.2	4.3	3.4	3.6	32.4	14.7	5.4	14.2
Ipsos	24–26 Oct	–	–	6.4	10.1	4.9	18.1	6.9	3.8	3.7	29.3	13.1	3.7	11.2
InFact	21 Oct	1,004	–	6.0	8.1	3.8	19.7	5.5	5.0	3.7	28.7	15.0	4.5	9.0
Norstat	18–23 Oct	953	–	6.7	8.9	4.4	18.0	6.0	5.1	4.0	28.9	13.2	4.9	10.9
Sentio	11–17 Oct	1,000	–	7.1	9.3	3.8	18.1	5.2	4.0	3.7	29.3	13.7	6.0	11.2
Norfakta	11–12 Oct	1,000	75.0	5.4	10.1	3.4	20.5	5.9	5.0	3.6	30.5	12.3	3.4	10.0
Respons Analyse	5–10 Oct	1,000	–	7.0	9.8	3.7	20.0	5.5	4.1	2.9	30.0	13.1	3.9	10.0
Opinion	4–10 Oct	968	67.0	5.4	8.2	2.9	22.6	5.6	3.4	3.4	30.2	13.6	4.7	7.6
Norstat	27 Sep – 2 Oct	960	–	7.0	9.1	3.1	19.9	6.2	3.4	3.4	29.2	14.4	4.3	9.3
Kantar	26–30 Sep	984	–	8.1	7.2	4.2	19.4	6.7	4.4	3.5	26.1	14.2	6.1	6.7
Ipsos	29 Sep	–	–	8.4	6.3	3.4	19.4	7.7	4.1	2.7	28.2	15.5	4.4	8.8
Norstat	20–25 Sep	950	–	8.3	7.6	2.8	20.5	3.9	4.3	4.4	28.2	15.5	4.4	7.7
Sentio	13–19 Sep	1,000	–	7.5	7.4	4.0	19.1	5.4	5.0	4.3	26.6	16.7	4.2	7.5
Respons Analyse	7–12 Sep	1,000	–	6.5	8.9	3.5	19.8	6.0	4.9	3.3	30.2	12.7	4.2	10.4
Opinion	6–12 Sep	968	68.0	8.6	9.5	3.0	21.5	6.3	4.5	2.7	28.3	11.0	4.7	6.8
Norfakta	5–7 Sep	1,003	–	6.0	9.2	4.0	19.2	6.5	4.6	3.7	28.7	14.1	4.0	9.5
Norstat	30 Aug – 4 Sep	940	–	6.8	7.4	3.4	19.6	6.4	5.3	3.1	32.4	12.6	3.0	12.8
Kantar	29 Aug – 2 Sep	976	–	8.2	8.4	3.7	20.8	4.6	4.5	3.5	27.8	14.1	4.5	7.0
Norstat	23–29 Aug	940	–	8.5	7.3	3.1	21.5	5.7	4.2	3.4	29.3	13.5	3.7	7.8
Ipsos	26 Aug	–	–	7.4	7.4	3.5	21.6	5.7	4.2	3.8	27.2	15.1	4.1	5.6
Sentio	16–22 Aug	1,000	–	5.8	8.7	3.8	20.2	6.9	3.8	4.9	28.9	13.4	3.5	8.7
Respons Analyse	10–15 Aug	1,000	–	7.5	9.5	3.8	19.9	6.6	4.1	3.9	28.9	12.3	3.5	9.0
Norstat	9–14 Aug	960	–	5.8	8.9	3.7	19.4	5.9	4.6	3.8	30.0	14.4	3.5	10.6
Opinion	2–8 Aug	971	70.0	5.1	8.4	3.1	19.3	6.0	5.0	3.2	29.1	14.8	5.9	9.8
Kantar	1–5 Aug	981	70.3	7.0	9.9	3.6	20.4	6.8	4.9	3.3	27.2	13.2	3.7	6.8
Norfakta	2–3 Aug	1,005	79.0	6.4	8.5	4.1	22.2	7.2	3.7	2.9	28.7	13.3	3.0	6.5
Norfakta	5–6 Jul	1,005	–	5.4	10.0	3.6	21.2	5.6	4.0	3.2	28.9	14.0	4.1	7.7
Kantar	24–30 Jun	976	79.0	6.9	8.3	3.0	21.4	6.7	4.4	3.1	29.5	13.1	3.9	8.1
Ipsos	27–29 Jun	–	–	6.3	9.0	3.5	23.1	4.7	4.0	3.6	26.8	14.8	4.2	3.7
Norstat	13–20 Jun	951	75.0	5.3	8.5	3.8	20.5	7.3	3.5	2.6	29.1	15.8	3.6	8.6
Sentio	7–13 Jun	1,000	–	5.7	9.5	4.3	22.2	7.0	4.6	3.5	24.6	14.6	3.9	2.4
Respons Analyse	4–9 Jun	1,000	–	6.8	9.0	4.0	20.2	7.4	4.9	3.9	26.8	14.0	3.0	6.6
Norfakta	7–8 Jun	1,001	78.0	5.6	8.3	3.0	23.0	6.9	5.3	3.8	27.8	13.1	3.2	4.8
Opinion	31 May – 5 Jun	965	72.0	5.4	9.3	2.9	19.7	9.2	4.2	2.8	28.0	14.1	4.5	8.3
Kantar	30 May – 3 Jun	979	–	7.0	10.0	2.7	21.8	7.7	5.1	2.0	26.3	13.9	3.5	4.5
Norstat	24–30 May	949	–	5.4	9.7	3.6	21.8	6.3	5.4	3.2	26.7	13.0	5.0	4.9
Ipsos	23–25 May	–	–	6.9	8.4	4.1	21.8	7.4	6.1	3.6	25.7	13.0	3.1	3.9
Norstat	16–23 May	950	77.0	6.5	7.3	3.0	23.9	6.1	4.7	4.7	26.8	12.8	4.3	2.9
Sentio	9–15 May	1,000	–	6.0	7.1	3.2	21.3	8.4	4.9	3.5	28.8	13.4	3.3	7.5
Opinion	3–9 May	967	71.0	6.8	7.9	2.6	22.8	6.9	3.8	4.4	27.0	13.9	3.8	4.2
Respons Analyse	4–9 May	1,000	–	5.7	8.4	3.3	22.1	6.4	4.4	3.8	29.0	12.8	4.1	6.9
Norfakta	3–4 May	1,000	–	6.0	7.9	3.5	23.1	8.0	4.9	3.6	26.4	13.0	3.6	3.3
Kantar	3 May	–	–	6.5	8.2	4.1	23.1	7.4	4.4	3.5	28.4	11.5	2.7	5.3
Norstat	26 Apr – 2 May	963	77.0	6.7	7.6	3.3	24.8	6.6	5.0	3.0	26.5	13.0	3.6	1.7
Ipsos	25–27 Apr	936	–	5.9	8.6	3.9	23.8	9.4	5.5	3.4	26.2	10.6	2.7	2.4
Norstat	19–25 Apr	952	–	6.6	9.6	3.2	20.9	5.5	4.3	3.1	28.3	14.3	4.2	7.4
Sentio	5–10 Apr	1,000	–	5.7	6.0	3.9	24.5	8.6	5.7	3.2	27.6	11.2	3.6	3.1
Opinion	6 Apr	–	–	6.4	7.1	3.2	25.8	7.1	5.6	3.4	25.6	12.7	3.2	0.2
Norfakta	5–6 Apr	1,001	79.0	7.2	8.7	3.3	23.8	6.1	4.4	2.5	29.6	11.3	3.1	5.8
Respons Analyse	4–6 Apr	1,003	–	6.2	7.8	2.9	23.1	8.0	3.7	4.0	27.6	13.3	3.4	4.5
Kantar	28 Mar – 1 Apr	982	–	5.0	8.3	3.4	23.2	6.6	4.3	3.3	27.7	13.9	4.4	4.5
Norstat	22–28 Mar	945	–	6.9	7.8	4.2	20.9	8.5	4.1	4.6	27.3	12.5	3.2	6.4
Ipsos	21–23 Mar	938	79.0	6.6	7.1	2.6	24.0	7.6	4.3	3.1	26.4	13.2	5.1	2.4
Norstat	15–20 Mar	958	–	8.5	5.9	4.2	22.6	6.6	3.9	3.3	28.6	11.2	5.2	6.0
Respons Analyse	9–14 Mar	1,000	–	6.5	7.4	4.2	23.0	8.0	4.9	3.6	25.5	13.3	3.6	1.5
Sentio	8–14 Mar	1,000	75.0	7.2	8.7	2.9	22.5	9.2	4.9	2.5	27.5	10.4	4.1	5.0
Opinion	2–7 Mar	965	72.0	8.0	6.5	4.4	23.6	7.5	4.3	3.8	26.9	11.6	3.4	3.3
Norfakta	1–2 Mar	1,007	80.0	7.3	8.7	4.3	21.8	9.7	5.1	3.1	25.8	11.1	3.1	4.0
Norstat	22–28 Feb	956	77.0	8.9	7.9	3.4	22.6	9.1	4.3	4.2	24.9	10.9	4.0	2.3
Ipsos	21–23 Feb	989	74.0	8.1	8.1	2.8	25.5	8.0	4.7	2.7	26.8	10.5	2.9	1.3
Kantar	22–28 Feb	1303	–	7.8	9.5	3.6	21.7	8.4	5.1	3.9	26.4	10.0	3.6	4.7
Norstat	15–20 Feb	952	–	10.5	8.3	3.0	22.8	7.5	4.6	2.4	25.4	11.3	4.3	2.6
Respons Analyse	9–14 Feb	1,000	–	9.4	8.9	3.3	22.0	8.2	3.5	3.0	25.3	12.5	3.9	3.3
Sentio	8–12 Feb	–	99.9	8.1	10.6	3.3	21.9	7.9	4.9	3.1	24.9	11.4	3.8	3.0
Opinion	1–7 Feb	–	–	10.3	8.2	3.3	21.9	9.5	4.4	3.6	25.8	9.8	3.1	3.9
Norfakta	1–2 Feb	–	–	8.4	8.5	2.6	23.4	7.2	5.0	3.7	25.8	12.2	3.3	2.4
Norstat	25–31 Jan	–	–	8.3	10.4	3.3	20.0	8.7	3.8	3.6	26.2	12.2	3.5	6.2
Kantar	25–31 Jan	–	–	8.4	9.7	3.0	21.2	9.0	4.8	3.3	25.4	11.4	3.8	4.2
Ipsos	24–26 Jan	–	–	6.1	9.9	4.2	22.4	10.2	3.4	3.3	24.3	12.6	3.6	1.9
Norstat	18–24 Jan	969	–	9.5	8.5	3.5	20.8	8.8	3.7	3.1	27.1	11.2	3.8	6.3
Sentio	10–15 Jan	1,000	–	5.8	9.2	3.8	22.3	9.3	4.1	5.0	25.6	12.0	3.0	3.3
Respons Analyse	5–10 Jan	1,000	–	6.6	9.4	4.3	23.5	9.8	4.4	2.7	25.6	10.6	3.1	2.1
Opinion	4–9 Jan	970	75.0	7.8	9.7	4.8	18.9	9.4	4.2	2.8	26.6	12.8	2.9	7.7
Kantar	3–7 Jan	972	–	6.2	9.1	4.6	21.7	10.7	5.1	2.9	23.7	11.4	4.8	2.0
Norfakta	4–5 Jan	1,001	–	7.1	8.4	3.6	24.3	9.9	4.4	3.7	24.9	10.9	2.9	0.6
Norstat	27 Dec – 3 Jan	943	–	6.2	9.4	3.3	21.1	9.8	4.9	3.2	24.7	13.9	3.6	3.6
2021 election	13 Sep	—N/a	77.1	4.7	7.6	3.9	26.3	13.5	4.6	3.8	20.4	11.6	3.6	5.9

=== 2021 ===
Polling firm	Fieldwork date	Sample size	Resp.	R	SV	MDG	Ap	Sp	V	KrF	H	FrP	Others	Lead
InFact	20 Dec	1,015	–	6.1	9.1	3.4	21.6	9.9	4.7	3.2	25.4	13.8	2.8	3.8
Norstat	14–20 Dec	957	–	7.6	9.3	3.7	22.7	10.1	5.3	3.6	23.3	11.0	3.4	0.6
Ipsos	13–15 Dec	947	84.0	5.8	9.4	2.8	20.7	10.4	6.3	2.9	24.8	12.8	4.1	4.1
Respons Analyse	8–13 Dec	1,001	–	6.1	10.4	3.5	22.6	10.0	4.0	3.4	26.3	11.4	2.3	3.7
Sentio	7–13 Dec	1,000	–	5.6	8.1	3.5	25.0	9.9	5.8	3.5	23.0	11.7	3.8	2.0
Opinion	9 Dec	–	–	6.9	9.2	3.0	23.9	12.0	4.8	3.1	23.1	11.1	3.0	0.8
Norfakta	7–8 Dec	1,002	85.0	5.1	9.6	3.6	21.7	12.3	5.1	3.5	24.8	11.1	3.2	3.0
Kantar	7 Dec	–	–	4.9	9.8	3.3	23.4	10.7	5.1	3.4	24.6	10.0	4.8	1.2
Norstat	23–27 Nov	988	80.0	5.0	10.3	3.7	25.0	12.4	3.5	2.6	22.1	12.0	3.3	2.9
Ipsos	22–24 Nov	941	–	5.4	9.3	4.2	24.0	13.4	4.5	2.5	22.3	11.3	3.1	2.7
Norstat	16–22 Nov	964	–	6.5	9.9	3.4	24.3	11.6	4.4	3.4	20.5	13.0	3.1	3.8
Sentio	9–14 Nov	1,000	–	5.1	8.5	4.1	27.3	11.4	5.0	3.9	20.7	11.1	2.9	6.6
Respons Analyse	10–15 Nov	1,001	86.0	4.8	8.5	4.1	25.5	13.1	5.2	2.8	21.7	11.0	3.3	3.8
Opinion	2–8 Nov	962	–	5.3	8.8	3.0	26.0	13.3	4.8	3.6	20.9	12.0	2.2	5.1
Norfakta	2–3 Nov	–	–	4.6	8.2	4.1	27.9	12.7	4.7	3.3	21.7	10.0	2.8	6.5
Kantar	2 Nov	–	–	5.3	8.6	3.7	26.8	12.0	4.3	3.2	21.4	11.5	3.2	5.4
Ipsos	31 Oct	–	–	4.9	8.3	3.4	25.7	15.0	4.1	4.0	20.7	9.8	4.0	5.0
Norstat	26–31 Oct	954	–	5.9	8.2	4.2	26.8	14.0	4.4	3.0	21.2	9.8	2.5	5.6
Norstat	19–24 Oct	953	–	4.7	8.9	3.2	28.0	13.2	4.7	3.1	21.1	11.0	2.2	6.9
Sentio	11–19 Oct	1,000	–	4.8	8.6	3.9	27.4	12.8	4.6	2.7	21.0	11.0	3.2	6.4
Respons Analyse	13–18 Oct	1,001	–	4.8	9.3	3.7	26.7	12.4	5.4	3.4	21.2	10.3	2.8	5.5
Opinion	5–11 Oct	977	–	5.3	8.5	3.8	25.8	13.1	4.7	3.8	21.5	11.0	2.6	4.3
Norfakta	5–6 Oct	1,003	–	4.7	8.9	3.5	26.0	13.7	4.3	4.1	20.6	11.6	2.6	5.4
Norstat	28 Sep – 3 Oct	1,000	83.0	4.9	9.0	3.7	25.6	13.1	4.5	3.4	20.5	12.0	3.4	5.1
Kantar	27 Sep – 1 Oct	978	–	5.4	8.3	4.2	27.9	13.2	4.3	3.2	18.9	11.7	2.9	9.0
Norstat	21–25 Sep	959	–	4.0	8.7	4.4	27.3	12.8	4.3	3.5	20.8	11.2	3.2	6.5
Sentio	14–21 Sep	1,000	–	5.4	7.5	5.5	28.2	12.0	4.1	3.1	20.0	11.2	2.9	8.2
2021 election	13 Sep	—N/a	77.1	4.7	7.6	3.9	26.3	13.5	4.6	3.8	20.4	11.6	3.6	5.9

== By electoral district ==
=== Akershus ===
Polling firm	Fieldwork date	Sample size	Resp.	R	SV	Ap	Sp	MDG	V	KrF	H	FrP	Others	Lead
2025 election	8 Sep	—N/a	–	4.2	5.2	27.3	2.9	5.4	5.4	2.6	19.4	23.6	4.0	3.6
Norstat	18–19 Aug 2025	800	–	4.9	6.1	27.5	3.5	4.9	4.9	3.1	20.1	20.4	4.7	7.1
Respons Analyse	14–19 Aug 2025	801	81.0	3.7	6.0	28.5	4.1	5.5	5.2	3.3	21.0	19.5	3.2	7.5
Norstat	29 Apr–16 May 2025	800	–	4.4	5.9	30.4	2.9	4.1	5.9	1.9	23.9	17.8	2.9	6.5
2021 election	13 Sep	—N/a	–	3.9	6.6	26.0	8.9	4.6	6.6	2.1	27.7	10.6	3.0	1.7

=== Aust–Agder ===
Polling firm	Fieldwork date	Sample size	Resp.	R	SV	Ap	Sp	MDG	V	KrF	H	FrP	Others	Lead
2025 election	8 Sep	—N/a	–	4.6	3.9	26.9	5.1	3.4	2.6	8.1	13.0	27.8	4.2	0.9
Respons Analyse	1 Sep 2025	–	–	6.1	5.1	25.5	6.7	3.6	4.4	9.7	13.0	22.9	2.8	2.6
Norstat	13–15 Aug 2025	800	–	3.7	5.4	22.7	5.4	2.9	3.3	10.0	14.3	27.3	4.9	4.6
Respons Analyse	2–6 Jun 2025	800	–	5.7	4.9	27.0	6.4	2.3	2.0	7.7	18.1	20.7	5.2	6.3
Norstat	29 Apr–16 May 2025	800	–	3.9	4.4	26.0	7.5	1.2	3.2	6.5	16.8	25.1	5.4	0.9
Respons Analyse	14–21 Feb 2025	800	79.0	3.7	5.3	27.7	5.7	2.4	3.0	7.8	17.1	24.4	2.9	3.3
Respons Analyse	21 Aug–2 Sep 2024	800	–	5.6	8.1	20.6	5.6	1.4	4.1	7.6	24.0	18.7	4.3	3.4
2021 election	13 Sep	—N/a	–	3.7	5.5	24.5	13.5	3.0	3.2	8.7	20.2	13.3	4.2	4.3

=== Buskerud ===
Polling firm	Fieldwork date	Sample size	Resp.	R	SV	Ap	Sp	MDG	V	KrF	H	FrP	Others	Lead
2025 election	8 Sep	—N/a	–	4.0	4.4	29.4	5.5	3.6	3.1	2.8	15.3	27.6	4.3	1.8
Sentio	25–29 Aug 2025	1,000	–	4.6	6.8	27.0	4.7	5.1	3.6	3.3	13.6	26.2	5.1	0.8
Norstat	15–16 Aug 2025	800	–	5.4	5.7	27.4	7.7	2.9	5.4	2.4	13.8	23.2	6.0	4.2
Sentio	3–9 Jun 2025	600	76.0	4.3	4.4	33.2	6.0	1.9	2.7	1.4	18.9	23.9	2.9	9.3
Norstat	29 Apr–16 May 2025	800	–	4.2	4.5	30.4	7.3	2.6	3.5	1.3	18.4	24.6	3.1	5.8
Sentio	24–28 Feb 2025	600	–	4.2	4.0	29.8	5.4	0.5	2.2	2.2	19.7	27.6	4.5	2.2
Sentio	9–13 Sep 2024	600	–	4.0	5.2	22.2	6.8	2.6	3.5	2.0	26.2	23.7	3.7	2.5
2021 election	13 Sep	—N/a	–	3.4	5.5	28.5	16.2	2.9	3.5	2.3	22.1	12.3	3.4	6.4

=== Finnmark ===
Polling firm	Fieldwork date	Sample size	Resp.	R	SV	Ap	Sp	MDG	V	KrF	H	FrP	Others	Lead
2025 election	8 Sep	—N/a	–	9.8	5.2	28.1	5.5	2.2	1.2	2.1	5.9	24.5	15.5	3.6
InFact	1 Sep 2025	1,050	–	10.3	6.3	31.5	5.0	2.1	1.2	2.3	5.0	19.9	16.6	11.6
Norstat	7–9 Aug 2025	800	–	10.0	6.0	28.2	4.8	1.6	0.8	2.2	5.9	23.0	17.5	5.2
InFact	2 Jun 2025	1,050	–	8.9	5.7	29.5	5.3	2.6	0.7	0.9	7.3	19.6	19.4	9.9
Norstat	29 Apr–16 May 2025	800	–	5.2	7.9	31.1	5.5	0.7	2.3	0.8	6.7	23.3	14.3	7.8
InFact	24 Mar 2025	1,063	–	7.6	7.2	27.8	5.3	1.2	1.4	1.4	8.1	24.4	15.6	3.4
Norstat	13–21 Mar 2025	800	70.0	9.4	8.5	28.5	6.4	1.0	1.2	1.2	8.2	24.2	11.4	4.3
Sentio	18–20 Nov 2024	601	–	8.3	7.3	19.6	4.7	2.6	2.0	0.6	10.7	28.8	16.0	9.2
Norstat	29 Oct–7 Nov 2024	1,000	–	9.4	10.7	20.4	5.8	2.9	2.5	1.2	10.0	24.4	12.7	4.0
InFact	10 Feb 2022	1,009	–	12.8	7.4	27.2	9.0	2.2	1.8	1.6	9.5	13.8	14.7	13.4
2021 election	13 Sep	—N/a	–	5.0	6.2	31.4	18.4	2.3	1.4	1.7	6.8	10.8	13.9	13.0

=== Hedmark ===
Polling firm	Fieldwork date	Sample size	Resp.	R	SV	Ap	Sp	MDG	V	KrF	H	FrP	Others	Lead
2025 election	8 Sep	—N/a	–	4.8	4.5	35.0	13.6	2.8	1.9	2.2	9.0	21.1	5.1	13.9
Norstat	17 Aug 2025	800	–	5.4	5.6	36.8	14.7	3.2	2.0	1.4	8.7	16.9	5.5	19.9
Sentio	18–21 Aug 2025	600	80.0	5.0	7.5	35.6	9.8	3.5	3.1	2.3	9.0	16.7	7.4	18.9
Norstat	29 Apr–16 May 2025	800	–	4.8	5.5	38.2	13.9	1.5	2.1	1.7	11.4	17.5	3.4	20.7
Sentio	17–21 Feb 2025	600	73.0	6.0	6.9	35.6	9.5	1.7	1.8	1.3	13.6	18.1	5.5	17.5
Sentio	28 Oct–4 Nov 2024	600	–	3.9	7.6	23.2	14.8	2.8	3.7	1.4	17.6	21.0	4.0	2.2
2021 election	13 Sep	—N/a	–	3.3	6.7	33.3	28.3	2.0	2.2	1.6	10.6	8.5	3.5	5.0

=== Hordaland ===
Polling firm	Fieldwork date	Sample size	Resp.	R	SV	Ap	Sp	MDG	V	KrF	H	FrP	Others	Lead
2025 election	8 Sep	—N/a	–	5.0	5.8	26.7	4.2	4.9	3.4	5.0	16.9	23.8	4.3	2.9
Respons Analyse	2–4 Sep 2025	806	89.0	5.4	6.5	24.4	4.7	7.0	3.5	5.7	17.6	21.9	3.3	2.5
Sentio	25–31 Aug 2025	1,000	–	5.4	6.2	28.6	3.1	5.3	4.3	6.2	14.7	21.6	5.8	7.0
Respons Analyse	20–26 Aug 2025	811	82.0	7.0	7.2	26.4	3.5	5.4	3.5	5.3	16.9	21.0	3.8	5.4
Norstat	12 Aug 2025	800	–	6.3	7.4	26.1	4.5	3.7	4.3	6.1	16.0	22.5	3.4	3.6
Respons Analyse	7–12 Aug 2025	800	78.0	5.8	7.5	25.8	3.4	3.8	3.0	5.6	16.8	24.7	3.6	1.1
Sentio	28 Jul–4 Aug 2025	1,000	–	6.1	9.1	26.0	4.2	3.1	3.5	4.8	16.4	22.7	4.0	3.3
Respons Analyse	20–23 Jun 2025	800	78.0	6.3	8.1	27.8	4.5	3.2	3.4	4.6	18.0	19.5	4.6	8.3
Sentio	9–13 Jun 2025	600	78.0	6.0	7.1	27.2	3.5	4.3	3.1	3.2	17.5	22.7	4.6	4.5
Respons Analyse	19–22 May 2025	800	79.0	5.7	7.0	26.6	4.2	3.8	4.8	4.5	18.9	21.4	3.1	5.2
Norstat	29 Apr–16 May 2025	800	–	5.5	7.5	28.3	3.1	3.5	3.5	4.5	20.8	21.2	2.1	7.1
Sentio	24–28 Apr 2025	600	76.0	5.0	6.8	29.3	3.8	2.6	3.2	4.5	16.8	24.2	3.5	5.1
Respons Analyse	24–27 Mar 2025	800	77.0	3.9	8.8	26.5	3.8	1.5	4.1	4.0	23.6	20.9	2.9	2.9
Norstat	6–9 Jan 2025	793	–	5.7	8.5	16.6	3.5	2.0	3.9	5.2	25.3	26.6	2.7	1.3
Respons Analyse	26–28 Nov 2024	801	79.0	4.4	10.5	14.3	4.8	2.7	6.1	4.2	24.9	24.4	3.7	0.5
Respons Analyse	20 Aug–4 Sep 2024	1,000	72.0	4.2	10.5	17.5	4.8	3.7	4.4	3.9	29.0	17.9	4.1	11.1
2021 election	13 Sep	—N/a	–	4.6	8.8	22.8	9.9	3.8	4.2	4.9	24.6	12.7	3.7	1.8

=== Møre og Romsdal ===
Polling firm	Fieldwork date	Sample size	Resp.	R	SV	Ap	Sp	MDG	V	KrF	H	FrP	Others	Lead
2025 election	8 Sep	—N/a	–	3.5	3.8	23.6	7.3	3.1	3.0	6.8	12.6	32.3	4.0	8.7
Respons Analyse	1–3 Sep 2025	812	84.0	4.1	4.7	22.9	8.9	5.2	3.2	7.3	9.0	30.6	3.1	7.7
Norstat	11 Aug 2025	800	–	4.8	5.8	22.7	5.9	2.5	4.5	7.0	12.1	30.4	4.3	7.7
Respons Analyse	8–13 Aug 2025	809	80.0	3.9	5.4	22.6	7.5	3.8	3.3	6.3	12.0	31.1	4.1	8.5
Respons Analyse	20–23 Jun 2025	802	–	4.7	6.5	24.5	6.3	1.9	2.7	6.9	12.4	28.6	5.5	4.1
Norstat	29 Apr–16 May 2025	800	–	4.4	6.0	23.7	7.5	1.9	2.3	5.4	15.2	30.5	3.1	6.8
Respons Analyse	17–24 Feb 2025	801	78.0	3.5	5.6	22.4	7.8	1.8	1.9	4.3	15.8	34.2	2.7	11.8
Respons Analyse	20–31 Aug 2024	801	73.0	3.5	6.5	17.3	7.4	2.4	3.3	5.8	19.8	30.8	3.2	11.0
2021 election	13 Sep	—N/a	–	3.3	6.3	20.2	17.5	2.5	2.9	5.3	16.3	22.1	3.7	1.9

=== Nord–Trøndelag ===
Polling firm	Fieldwork date	Sample size	Resp.	R	SV	Ap	Sp	MDG	V	KrF	H	FrP	Others	Lead
2025 election	8 Sep	—N/a	–	5.2	4.2	36.3	14.8	2.4	1.8	2.6	9.0	19.5	4.2	16.8
Norstat	25–30 Aug 2025	500	–	5.8	6.5	35.5	15.3	3.0	1.0	3.0	10.8	15.8	3.4	19.7
Sentio	25–30 Aug 2025	603	75.1	7.2	4.6	34.5	13.0	3.3	1.6	2.7	8.5	19.9	4.7	14.6
Norstat	9–11 Aug 2025	800	–	5.8	4.6	36.5	15.4	1.8	3.3	2.4	9.4	16.7	4.2	19.8
Sentio	28 Jun–4 Aug 2025	600	–	6.9	6.8	31.5	14.7	1.3	2.0	2.4	7.3	20.5	6.5	11.0
Sentio	18–24 Jun 2025	600	–	5.1	6.2	36.4	13.5	2.3	1.6	2.0	7.7	19.5	5.7	16.9
Norstat	29 Apr–16 May 2025	800	–	5.3	6.0	36.1	14.6	0.8	1.9	2.3	12.6	15.0	5.3	21.1
Norstat	20–25 Mar 2025	500	75.0	5.1	6.5	35.6	11.9	1.0	1.9	2.6	11.9	19.5	4.0	16.1
Sentio	3–9 Mar 2025	600	–	5.2	3.9	36.1	14.6	0.7	1.9	1.8	11.9	22.2	1.8	13.9
Norstat	25 Sep–1 Oct 2024	500	67.0	6.7	5.3	25.4	15.9	1.8	3.2	2.4	16.8	19.0	3.7	6.4
Sentio	9–16 Sep 2024	600	69.0	5.3	9.0	28.2	14.3	1.7	2.6	2.4	16.5	16.8	3.1	11.4
Sentio	30 Jun–6 Jul 2022	600	75.0	5.4	6.2	29.6	18.7	1.2	2.2	2.5	18.5	12.9	2.7	10.9
Norstat	7–12 Feb 2022	500	90.0	7.1	8.0	29.6	25.5	1.4	1.9	2.2	14.2	6.3	3.8	4.1
2021 election	13 Sep	—N/a	–	4.0	5.7	33.6	28.8	1.9	2.0	2.3	10.6	8.0	3.1	4.8

=== Nordland ===
Polling firm	Fieldwork date	Sample size	Resp.	R	SV	Ap	Sp	MDG	V	KrF	H	FrP	Others	Lead
2025 election	8 Sep	—N/a	–	6.6	5.7	30.6	8.6	2.9	2.0	2.4	11.2	25.6	4.4	5.0
InFact	1 Sep 2025	1,098	–	7.7	6.9	29.7	10.5	3.4	1.8	2.3	11.3	22.8	3.5	6.9
Norstat	7–10 Aug 2025	800	–	8.1	6.9	32.7	7.4	1.8	2.6	4.4	11.0	21.8	3.3	10.9
Norstat	26 Jun–4 Aug 2025	800	–	7.0	6.0	32.2	8.2	0.7	2.4	2.2	10.0	26.3	5.3	5.9
Norstat	29 Apr–16 May 2025	800	–	7.9	6.3	31.6	7.4	2.7	0.7	2.6	16.2	22.4	2.3	9.2
Norstat	13–20 Mar 2025	800	74.0	6.8	6.6	32.8	6.8	1.9	2.3	2.3	11.9	22.5	6.1	10.3
Norstat	25–29 Nov 2024	1,000	–	5.1	9.5	16.7	9.5	2.5	3.0	2.6	17.6	28.7	4.8	11.1
Norstat	3–6 Sep 2024	595	–	7.3	7.9	26.3	8.3	1.6	3.3	2.2	17.7	21.0	4.3	5.3
Norstat	4–9 Dec 2023	599	–	3.9	14.4	19.8	8.0	1.4	2.8	2.4	23.3	16.6	7.5	3.5
2021 election	13 Sep	—N/a	–	5.4	6.9	29.0	21.3	2.2	2.4	2.0	15.4	12.3	3.1	7.7

=== Oppland ===
Polling firm	Fieldwork date	Sample size	Resp.	R	SV	Ap	Sp	MDG	V	KrF	H	FrP	Others	Lead
2025 election	8 Sep	—N/a	–	4.5	4.5	33.2	15.8	2.9	2.2	2.2	9.2	21.4	4.1	11.8
Norstat	16–17 Aug 2025	800	–	5.4	5.9	31.2	17.3	2.9	2.8	2.5	9.6	18.2	4.2	13.0
Sentio	18–22 Aug 2025	600	85.3	5.9	6.5	31.0	14.4	2.1	2.2	1.7	9.6	20.8	5.8	10.2
Norstat	29 Apr–16 May 2025	800	–	4.4	5.5	35.3	15.9	1.7	1.9	1.7	12.3	17.7	3.7	17.6
Sentio	17–21 Feb 2025	600	75.0	5.1	3.9	34.6	14.1	2.1	1.6	0.7	15.3	18.9	3.8	15.7
Sentio	28 Oct–4 Nov 2024	600	–	6.2	8.2	18.4	16.1	2.8	8.2	2.0	14.7	25.8	1.8	7.4
InFact	19 Feb 2024	1,052	–	5.3	8.2	27.5	16.0	2.0	2.4	2.1	18.4	13.2	4.8	9.1
Markedsinfo	14–16 Jun 2022	–	–	7.2	7.2	28.9	14.3	2.1	2.6	1.8	23.1	11.1	1.8	5.8
2021 election	13 Sep	—N/a	–	3.7	5.3	35.2	26.2	2.2	2.3	1.6	12.5	8.6	2.4	9.0

=== Oslo ===
Polling firm	Fieldwork date	Sample size	Resp.	R	SV	Ap	Sp	MDG	V	KrF	H	FrP	Others	Lead
2025 election	8 Sep	—N/a	–	7.2	10.7	25.7	0.8	10.3	7.3	2.1	18.5	14.3	3.1	7.2
Verian	19 Aug–3 Sep 2025	832	–	7.7	11.8	24.7	1.2	11.6	7.0	1.6	21.0	11.9	1.5	3.7
Respons Analyse	28 Aug–3 Sep 2025	806	–	8.0	10.7	24.8	0.4	12.5	8.7	2.9	19.2	10.7	2.1	5.6
Norstat	17–18 Aug 2025	800	–	9.9	10.3	24.7	0.5	11.6	9.0	1.6	17.0	13.5	1.8	7.7
Respons Analyse	17–21 Jun 2025	795	–	9.8	12.6	25.5	0.6	4.6	9.6	1.5	21.3	11.4	3.0	4.2
Norstat	29 Apr–16 May 2025	800	–	8.4	10.8	25.3	0.5	6.1	9.4	1.6	22.4	12.7	1.5	2.9
Respons Analyse	27 Apr–7 May 2025	1,000	83.0	6.6	12.0	26.2	0.8	6.2	9.6	2.2	22.8	12.9	0.9	3.4
Norstat	7–14 Oct 2024	988	–	8.2	12.4	15.8	1.2	7.1	11.9	1.6	29.0	10.6	2.2	13.2
Respons Analyse	14–20 Mar 2023	1,034	84.0	8.1	14.6	17.6	0.9	6.7	8.8	1.4	35.6	4.9	1.4	18.0
Respons Analyse	14–16 Dec 2022	1,001	86.0	7.7	15.8	16.5	1.3	7.1	9.6	2.1	32.9	5.1	1.9	16.4
Respons Analyse	16 Sep 2022	–	–	8.3	12.4	20.8	0.8	7.9	8.3	1.8	31.2	6.4	2.1	10.4
Respons Analyse	14–18 Mar 2022	1,000	86.0	10.4	12.4	19.3	1.7	6.9	10.0	1.6	30.6	5.2	1.9	11.3
Respons Analyse	9–16 Dec 2021	1,000	90.0	8.4	15.9	20.7	2.5	6.9	10.3	1.6	27.8	4.5	1.4	7.1
2021 election	13 Sep	—N/a	–	8.3	13.3	23.0	3.1	8.5	10.0	1.8	23.5	6.0	2.5	0.5

=== Rogaland ===
Polling firm	Fieldwork date	Sample size	Resp.	R	SV	Ap	Sp	MDG	V	KrF	H	FrP	Others	Lead
2025 election	8 Sep	—N/a	–	5.5	3.7	23.7	5.0	2.7	2.6	8.4	15.3	28.7	4.4	5.0
Norstat	12–13 Aug 2025	800	–	5.7	4.9	21.4	3.8	2.7	2.2	10.2	15.8	29.0	4.2	7.6
Sentio	18–22 Aug 2025	600	83.0	6.4	4.1	25.3	4.5	2.3	4.3	8.1	16.2	23.2	5.6	2.1
Respons Analyse	12–15 Aug 2025	801	80.0	5.8	5.7	19.2	5.6	2.5	3.3	9.4	17.6	25.4	5.2	6.2
Norstat	29 Apr–16 May 2025	800	–	5.1	3.6	24.2	5.6	1.3	2.1	7.9	20.8	26.0	3.4	1.8
Respons Analyse	24–28 Mar 2025	801	81.0	4.0	5.1	24.6	4.2	1.4	3.7	6.0	20.7	26.7	3.6	2.1
Sentio	3–9 Mar 2025	600	78.3	4.1	4.5	28.1	5.2	2.8	2.5	5.5	18.5	25.3	3.0	2.8
Respons Analyse	12–17 Dec 2024	801	77.0	4.9	5.9	13.7	6.4	1.1	5.0	6.4	23.5	29.1	4.0	5.6
Sentio	28 Oct–4 Nov 2024	600	–	4.8	9.8	15.1	2.2	1.5	4.2	7.2	25.5	24.3	5.4	1.2
Respons Analyse	20 Aug–3 Sep 2024	800	–	5.0	4.2	18.3	4.9	2.3	2.9	6.8	27.6	22.1	5.7	5.5
2021 election	13 Sep	—N/a	–	3.7	4.9	22.4	10.5	2.4	3.4	8.1	24.0	16.9	3.7	1.6

=== Sogn og Fjordane ===
Polling firm	Fieldwork date	Sample size	Resp.	R	SV	Ap	Sp	MDG	V	KrF	H	FrP	Others	Lead
2025 election	8 Sep	—N/a	–	4.0	4.3	30.9	16.0	3.3	2.9	4.3	10.2	20.8	3.3	10.1
InFact	29 Aug 2025	1,022	–	5.2	5.4	27.4	17.0	4.7	3.4	5.6	8.8	19.4	3.1	8.0
Norstat	12–13 Aug 2025	800	–	5.1	5.9	30.6	15.8	1.9	2.8	4.5	10.8	17.9	4.9	12.7
Norstat	29 Apr–16 May 2025	800	–	5.6	5.9	32.5	14.0	1.8	4.2	2.9	12.8	17.5	2.9	15.0
Norstat	6–10 Jan 2025	796	–	2.8	6.1	23.1	14.6	3.5	5.2	3.9	14.6	24.6	1.0	1.5
InFact	17 Feb 2022	1,011	–	7.9	6.2	23.4	21.8	3.0	3.5	3.4	17.6	10.8	2.5	1.6
2021 election	13 Sep	—N/a	–	4.0	5.6	26.5	28.7	2.3	3.3	3.9	13.9	9.4	2.4	2.2

=== Sør–Trøndelag ===
Polling firm	Fieldwork date	Sample size	Resp.	R	SV	Ap	Sp	MDG	V	KrF	H	FrP	Others	Lead
2025 election	8 Sep	—N/a	–	6.0	6.9	32.0	6.8	5.8	3.7	2.5	12.5	19.8	4.0	12.2
Norstat	25–30 Aug 2025	500	–	6.8	8.4	30.4	6.4	6.1	3.2	3.0	13.2	20.2	2.2	10.2
Norstat	9–11 Aug 2025	800	–	7.1	9.3	33.4	6.1	5.1	4.9	1.8	12.7	15.5	4.2	17.9
Norstat	29 Apr–16 May 2025	800	–	5.3	9.1	32.6	6.0	3.4	2.6	2.2	16.4	18.0	4.3	14.6
Norstat	25–30 Sep 2024	500	73.0	6.7	12.9	21.2	7.1	4.6	4.2	1.6	21.3	18.0	2.5	0.1
Norstat	7–10 Feb 2022	500	–	9.6	9.9	23.8	12.2	4.4	4.2	2.4	21.1	9.0	3.3	2.7
2021 election	13 Sep	—N/a	–	5.6	9.1	29.8	15.1	4.8	4.4	2.2	16.5	8.6	3.9	13.3

=== Telemark ===
Polling firm	Fieldwork date	Sample size	Resp.	R	SV	Ap	Sp	MDG	V	KrF	H	FrP	Others	Lead
2025 election	8 Sep	—N/a	–	5.9	4.1	31.3	6.2	3.3	2.1	5.0	11.0	26.1	5.0	5.2
InFact	2 Sep 2025	1,027	–	6.7	3.3	32.1	8.1	4.4	2.7	5.2	10.6	22.5	4.5	9.6
Norstat	14–16 Aug 2025	800	–	8.0	5.1	32.2	7.2	2.4	2.7	6.4	10.1	20.2	5.8	12.0
InFact	18 Aug 2025	1,068	–	7.0	4.8	29.6	7.6	4.1	2.4	4.5	10.9	22.9	6.1	6.7
InFact	27 May 2025	1,119	–	5.4	4.5	33.4	6.8	1.9	1.6	3.9	14.3	23.6	4.6	9.8
Norstat	29 Apr–16 May 2025	800	–	6.9	5.4	32.6	5.3	2.3	2.2	4.5	12.5	22.9	5.4	9.7
2021 election	13 Sep	—N/a	–	4.6	5.9	31.0	16.6	2.7	2.2	4.5	15.7	12.8	4.0	14.4

=== Troms ===
Polling firm	Fieldwork date	Sample size	Resp.	R	SV	Ap	Sp	MDG	V	KrF	H	FrP	Others	Lead
2025 election	8 Sep	—N/a	–	7.4	7.2	29.5	6.3	3.6	2.0	2.9	10.9	25.8	4.4	3.7
Norstat	3 Sep 2025	1,079	–	10.8	8.1	27.2	5.9	5.2	2.6	4.4	10.0	21.5	4.4	5.7
Norstat	7–9 Aug 2025	800	–	8.3	9.5	29.3	5.1	2.9	2.0	1.6	11.2	26.0	4.3	3.3
InFact	13 Aug 2025	1,091	–	8.3	7.7	27.4	6.4	3.7	2.5	2.2	8.6	26.6	6.5	0.8
InFact	26 Jun 2025	1,110	–	6.5	9.1	31.6	7.4	1.5	2.0	2.0	10.1	24.7	3.4	6.9
Norstat	29 Apr–16 May 2025	800	–	6.5	8.1	34.0	4.8	2.9	1.9	1.6	12.0	24.6	3.5	9.4
Norstat	13–21 Mar 2025	800	71.0	6.6	7.8	30.5	5.6	2.3	3.0	1.8	14.8	23.3	4.2	7.2
InFact	18 Dec 2024	1,085	–	7.9	13.3	19.0	5.6	1.3	3.3	1.8	14.0	30.3	3.6	11.3
InFact	10 Feb 2022	1,009	–	9.5	9.6	19.7	8.2	3.6	2.3	2.5	24.7	18.0	1.9	5.0
2021 election	13 Sep	—N/a	–	4.8	10.8	27.1	19.1	3.0	2.5	2.2	13.5	14.0	3.0	8.0

=== Vest–Agder ===
Polling firm	Fieldwork date	Sample size	Resp.	R	SV	Ap	Sp	MDG	V	KrF	H	FrP	Others	Lead
2025 election	8 Sep	—N/a	–	4.0	3.9	22.8	4.0	3.5	3.1	13.0	13.5	27.7	4.5	4.9
Respons Analyse	25–28 Aug 2025	801	83.0	5.2	4.8	21.1	4.1	2.8	4.5	16.5	13.8	24.4	2.8	3.3
Norstat	13–15 Aug 2025	800	–	3.5	4.1	22.2	4.6	3.5	3.6	16.7	12.9	24.5	4.4	2.3
Respons Analyse	2–6 Jun 2025	804	–	3.6	5.4	21.2	5.1	2.4	4.3	10.3	19.2	24.3	4.2	3.1
Norstat	29 Apr–16 May 2025	800	–	2.7	4.8	25.0	3.0	1.9	3.2	11.1	16.8	26.5	5.6	1.5
Respons Analyse	14–21 Feb 2025	806	81.0	2.9	4.8	19.4	5.9	2.2	2.2	10.1	21.6	27.9	3.0	6.3
Respons Analyse	21 Aug–2 Sep 2024	802	–	3.8	6.7	14.3	3.8	2.5	4.7	12.9	27.5	20.0	3.8	7.5
2021 election	13 Sep	—N/a	–	3.2	5.3	20.8	10.3	3.2	3.6	13.9	21.3	13.1	5.3	0.5

=== Vestfold ===
Polling firm	Fieldwork date	Sample size	Resp.	R	SV	Ap	Sp	MDG	V	KrF	H	FrP	Others	Lead
2025 election	8 Sep	—N/a	–	4.9	4.1	27.5	3.3	4.3	3.5	4.1	16.5	27.6	4.2	0.1
InFact	1 Sep 2025	2,637	–	4,7	4.6	27.8	5.1	4.4	3.3	5.2	14.8	25.4	4.6	2.4
Norstat	15–16 Aug 2025	800	–	5.5	5.9	26.9	4.3	4.3	3.6	4.7	17.2	22.1	5.0	4.8
InFact	10 Jun 2025	2,663	–	4.5	5.5	27.5	3.7	2.7	4.3	2.9	17.6	26.3	4.6	1.2
Norstat	29 Apr–16 May 2025	800	–	4.1	5.0	30.7	3.9	2.1	3.9	3.6	20.8	22.2	3.7	8.5
InFact	14 Apr 2025	2,664	–	5.2	4.8	29.5	3.6	2.2	4.0	2.9	21.2	23.6	2.9	5.9
Sentio	9–16 Sep 2024	600	–	4.6	5.5	21.9	4.4	4.2	3.3	2.8	28.0	21.0	4.4	6.1
2021 election	13 Sep	—N/a	–	4.4	6.0	27.0	10.0	3.8	4.0	3.5	25.2	12.5	3.6	1.8

=== Østfold ===
Polling firm	Fieldwork date	Sample size	Resp.	R	SV	Ap	Sp	MDG	V	KrF	H	FrP	Others	Lead
2025 election	8 Sep	—N/a	–	5.2	4.3	29.8	4.8	3.4	2.5	3.9	12.5	28.7	4.9	1.1
InFact	1 Sep 2025	1,057	–	5.4	5.3	30.0	7.1	4.6	2.8	4.6	10.5	25.6	4.2	4.4
Norstat	18–19 Aug 2025	800	–	5.7	6.3	30.6	5.3	3.3	2.3	4.2	14.1	23.6	4.6	6.0
InFact	28 May 2025	1,040	–	6.9	4.6	31.7	7.3	2.3	1.4	3.0	13.5	25.0	3.8	6.7
Norstat	29 Apr–16 May 2025	800	–	4.3	4.7	30.9	6.9	3.1	2.3	2.6	16.2	24.0	5.0	6.9
InFact	22 Jan 2025	1,031	–	5.7	6.7	22.4	6.1	2.2	3.9	2.8	16.3	29.0	5.0	6.6
2021 election	13 Sep	—N/a	–	4.5	5.9	30.6	14.2	2.9	2.8	3.3	18.7	12.8	4.3	11.9

== See also ==
- Opinion polling for the 2021 Norwegian parliamentary election
