= E sharp =

E sharp may refer to:

- E♯ (musical note) (see also E-sharp minor and F major)
- eSharp, a British research journal
- E!Sharp, a Brussels-based EU affairs magazine
- E Sharp (band), an Indie Rock band from Karachi, Sindh, Pakistan
