= Jennifer Baker =

Jennifer Baker may refer to:

- Jenny Oaks Baker (born 1975), American violinist
- Jennifer Baker (journalist), Irish journalist
