= Poll aggregator =

A poll aggregator is an entity that tracks and aggregates individual polls conducted by different organizations in order to gauge public sentiment on key civic issues such as the approval rating of a major political figure (e.g., president, prime minister, monarch, governor, lawmaker, etc.), or legislative body; or to measure likely public support for an individual candidate or political party in an upcoming election.

== Individual poll aggregation ==
A poll aggregator may also forecast the likely outcome of upcoming elections by gathering and analysing pre-election polls published by others, and/or utilizing other available politics-related information which, according to its methodology, may affect the outcome of an election. For example, an aggregator may attempt to predict the winner of a presidential election or the composition of a legislature, or it may focus on attempting to determine current opinion by smoothing out poll-to-poll variation. Editorial commentary by the site's owners and others complements the data. Interest and web traffic peak during the last few weeks before the election.

How individual polls are aggregated varies from site to site. Some aggregators take a long- or short-term running/rolling average or average the polls at certain points in time, while other aggregators might take a weighted poll average (e.g., giving less weight to older polls), or use some other proprietary method of aggregation, based on such factors as past pollster accuracy, age of the poll, or other more subjective factors. The averaging method has been criticized because it doesn't weight them by sample size. In this way, the resulting average support percentages do not reflect the actual support percentage for any candidate of the pooled polls. According to the American Association for Public Opinion Research, "[o]ther aggregators use regression-based analyses — a method for adjusting data to account for unusual results ('outliers'). Other aggregators combine additional data like historical election results or economic data with current polling data through statistical methods – these are often called modelers."

Aggregators are not capable of accounting for systematic errors in the polls themselves. For instance, if pollsters are misjudging the turnout demographics, aggregators cannot undo these errors. Likewise, when there is a tendency to herd (i.e. for different pollsters to converge on a particular result to avoid being an outlier), aggregators will reflect this. However, veteran political journalist Bill Moyers has commented that poll aggregators are a good tool for sorting out the polls.

RealClearPolitics was the first such website. It began aggregating polls in 2002 for the congressional elections that year. Several sites existed by 2004, including Andrew S. Tanenbaum's Electoral-vote.com, as well as Sam Wang's Princeton Election Consortium. Relative newcomer FiveThirtyEight began in 2008 by baseball statistician Nate Silver, and continued under the name The Silver Bulletin after his departure from 538's owner ABC in 2023. Pollster.com by Mark Blumenthal, was acquired byHuffPost as Huffpost Pollster in 2010, but cut back in 2017. Since 2010, the political blog Talking Points Memo has also sponsored a "PollTracker" feature which aggregates opinion polls. Other noteworthy examples include Drew Linzer's Votamatic, Josh Putnam's Frontloading HQ, and Jay DeSart and Tom Holbrook's Politics by the Numbers. In Australia, William Bowe's Poll Bludger hosts the BludgerTrack poll aggregator. Europe Elects, founded in 2014, is another poll aggregator that collects voting intention polling data from across the European continent. An example of aggregator of poll aggregators includes the PollyVote, which combines different polling averages as one component of a combined forecast of the U.S. presidential election result.
