= Political forecasting =

Predicting the outcomes of elections

Political forecasting aims at forecasting the outcomes of political events. Political events can be a number of events such as diplomatic decisions, actions by political leaders and other areas relating to politicians and political institutions. The area of political forecasting concerning elections is highly popular, especially amongst mass market audiences. Political forecasting methodology makes frequent use of mathematics, statistics and data science. Political forecasting as it pertains to elections is related to psephology.

== History ==
People have long been interested in predicting election outcomes. Mentions of betting odds on papal succession appear as early as 1503, with such wagering being already considered an "old practice." Political betting in secular elections also has a long history in Great Britain. As one prominent example, Charles James Fox, the late-eighteenth-century Whig statesman, was known as an inveterate gambler. His biographer, George Otto Trevelyan, noted that"[f]or ten years, from 1771 onwards, Charles Fox betted frequently, largely, and judiciously, on the social and political occurrences of the time."

Before the existence of widespread national polls in the early 20th century, betting odds provided a rudimentary form of election forecasting in the United States. According to Paul Rhode and Koleman Strumpf, who have researched the history of prediction markets, records of election betting in Wall Street back to 1884 exist. Rhode and Strumpf estimate that average betting turnover per US presidential election is equivalent to over 50 percent of the campaign expenditures, and betting odds correlate strongly to vote results. As far back as 1907, it was found that the median estimate of a group can be more accurate than individual expert estimates by Francis Galton. This is now known as the wisdom of the crowd.

During the 19th century, local straw poles were also often held in cities and other locations throughout the United States. The first reported record of such poles is in the Raleigh Star and North Carolina State Gazette and the Wilmington American Watchman and Delaware Advertiser prior to the 1824 presidential election, showing Andrew Jackson leading John Quincy Adams by 335 votes to 169. Jackson would win the popular vote in that state and the country.

In 1916, The Literary Digest took a national survey, one of the first ever taken, by mailing out millions of postcards and simply counting the returns, correctly predicting Woodrow Wilson's election as president. In this way, The Literary Digest also correctly predicted the victories of Warren Harding in 1920, Calvin Coolidge in 1924, Herbert Hoover in 1928, and Franklin Roosevelt in 1932.

The problems with such a method would become apparent in the 1936 election, and at this time George Gallup and others would take smaller but more scientifically conducted polls, which have since become a basic part of political forecasting.

With the advent of statistical techniques, electoral data have become increasingly easy to handle. It is no surprise, then, that election forecasting has become a big business, for polling firms, news organizations, and betting markets as well as academic students of politics.

Academic scholars have constructed models of voting behavior to forecast the outcomes of elections. These forecasts are derived from theories and empirical evidence about what matters to voters when they make electoral choices. The forecast models typically rely on a few predictors in highly aggregated form, with an emphasis on phenomena that change in the short-run, such as the state of the economy, so as to offer maximum leverage for predicting the result of a specific election. In a national or state election, macroeconomic conditions, such as employment, new job creation, the interest rate, and the inflation rate are also considered.

During the 1988 US presidential election, the University of Iowa's Tippie College of Business introduced the Iowa Electronic Markets, one of the first modern electronic prediction markets. Election forecasting in the United States was first brought to the attention of the wider public by Nate Silver and his FiveThirtyEight website in 2008. Currently, there are many competing models that exist to predict the outcomes of elections in the United States, the United Kingdom, and elsewhere.

In October 2024, Kalshi, a financial exchange and prediction market, won a lawsuit against its regulator, the Commodity Futures Trading Commission, with a federal appeals court in Washington, allowing it to revive the first fully regulated election prediction markets in the United States. Kalshi's court victory over the CFTC opened the market for election markets.

== Methods ==
=== Opinion polling ===
Opinion polls can be undertaken to apprehend the public opinion of a particular sample, and extrapolate therefrom the voter preferences of the general population, which can be used to predict voter behavior during an election

=== Averaging polls ===
Combining poll data lowers the forecasting mistakes of a poll.

=== Poll damping ===
Poll damping is when incorrect indicators of public opinion are not used in a forecast model. For instance, early in the campaign, polls are poor measures of the future choices of voters. The poll results closer to an election are a more accurate prediction. Campbell shows the power of poll damping in political forecasting.

=== Regression models ===
Political scientists and economists oftentimes use regression models of past elections. This is done to help forecast the votes of the political parties – for example, Democrats and Republicans in the US. The information helps their party's next presidential candidate forecast the future. Most models include at least one public opinion variable, a trial heat poll, or a presidential approval rating. Bayesian statistics can also be used to estimate the posterior distributions of the true proportion of voters that will vote for each candidate in each state, given both the polling data available and the previous election results for each state. Each poll can be weighted based on its age and its size, providing a highly dynamic forecasting mechanism as Election day approaches. http://electionanalytics.cs.illinois.edu/ is an example of a site that employs such methods.

=== Markets ===
Forecasting can involve skin-in-the-game crowdsourcing via prediction markets on the theory that people more honestly evaluate and express their true perception with money at stake. However, individuals with a large economic or ego investment in the outcome of a future election may be willing to sacrifice economic gain in order to alter public perception of the likely outcome of an election prior to election day—a positive perception of a favoured candidate is widely depicted as helping to "energize" voter turnout in support of that candidate when voting begins. When the prognosis derived from the election market itself becomes instrumental in determining voter turnout or voter preference leading up to an election, the valuation derived from the market becomes less reliable as a mechanism of political forecasting.

Prediction markets show very accurate forecasts of an election outcome. One example is the Iowa Electronic Markets. In a study, 964 election polls were compared with the five US presidential elections from 1988 to 2004. Berg et al. (2008) showed that the Iowa Electronic Markets topped the polls 74% of the time. However, damped polls have been shown to top prediction markets. Comparing damped polls to forecasts of the Iowa Electronic Markets, Erikson and Wlezien (2008) showed that the damped polls outperform all markets or models.

== Impact ==
According to a 2020 study, election forecasting "increases [voters'] certainty about an election's outcome, confuses many, and decreases turnout. Furthermore, we show that election forecasting has become prominent in the media, particularly in outlets with liberal audiences, and show that such coverage tends to more strongly affect the candidate who is ahead."

== Nomenclature ==
When discussing the likelihood of a particular electoral outcome, political forecasters tend to use one of a small range of shorthand phrases. These include:

- Solid (e.g., "Solid Republican"), also Safe. Very unlikely that the party which currently holds the seat will change in the upcoming election.
- Likely (e.g., "Likely Democratic"), also Favored. It is not thought at the moment that the seat will be particularly competitive, and hence the party is likely to remain unchanged, but there is a possibility this may alter.
- Lean (e.g., "Leans Independent"). One candidate / party has a slight advantage in polling and forecasting, but other outcomes are possible.
- Tilt. Used less widely than the other terms, but indicates a very small advantage to one or another party.
- Toss-Up. These are the seats that are considered to be the most competitive, with more than one party having a good chance of winning.

== Related forecasting models ==
Other types of forecasting include forecasting models designed to predict the outcomes of international relations or bargaining events. One notable example is the expected utility model developed by American political scientist Bruce Bueno de Mesquita, which solves for the Bayesian Perfect Equilibria outcome of unidimensional policy events, with numerous applications including international conflict and diplomacy. Various implementations of political science forecasting tools have become increasingly common in political science, and numerous other Bayesian models exist with their components increasingly detailed in scientific literature. Ranked voting requires polling ranked preferences to predict winners.

== See also ==
- British Polling Council
- Electoral Calculus
- Electoral geography
- Larry Sabato
- Political analyst
- Political data scientists
- PollyVote
- Psephologist
- Swing (politics)
- Types of democracy
