= E!Sharp =

Belgian-based English current affairs periodical

- Categories: Politics
- Frequency: Bimonthly
- Circulation: 14,756 (Jan-June 2009)
- Publisher: Paul Adamson
- Founder: Paul Adamson
- Founded: 2002; 23 years ago
- Company: Encompass Publications SA
- Country: Belgium
- Based in: Brussels
- Language: English
- Website: www.esharp.eu

E!Sharp is a bimonthly English-language magazine which covers EU affairs and transatlantic relations by providing analysis and commentary. Its editorial offices are in Brussels, Belgium.

== History and profile ==
E!Sharp was founded by Paul Adamson in 2002. The magazine was established to promote public interest on EU-related politics. For the first three years it was published on a monthly basis. Then it began to be published bimonthly. It also publishes a Jargon Alert guide which is available online.

E!Sharp claims a readership of "decision-makers in both policymaking and business circles, in Brussels and in national capitals around the EU." Between January and June 2009 the magazine had a circulation of 14,756 copies.

== See also ==
- EUobserver
- EURACTIV
- Euronews
- Politico Europe
