= Jennifer Baker (journalist) =

European journalist

- Born: from Carlow, Ireland
- Education: Ulster University
- Occupations: Journalist; Moderator; Correspondent
- Employer(s): Euractiv, Politico Europe, ArsTechnica, The Register, ViEUws, The Times, The New European
- Notable work: EU Tweets of the Week, covering Malta's accession to the EU

Jennifer Baker is a European journalist based in Brussels specialising in EU policy and legislation in the technology sector. She has written for ArsTechnica, ComputerWeekly, Macworld, PC World and The Register. She has been senior presenter on ViEUws and also features as an EU policy and tech expert on BBC Radio as well as Euronews.

== Biography ==
After graduating from Ulster University in Northern Ireland with a B.A. in Media Studies and a short stint in Dublin as a radio reporter, Baker moved to Malta in 2000, where she worked for The Malta Independent covering the country's EU accession. After six years in Bristol, UK, where she set up and ran Figure8media, she relocated to Brussels where she started working as the EU correspondent for the International Data Group covering policy relating to IT, trade agreements and antitrust cases.

Baker is the creator and presenter of the EU Tweets of the Week programme, a weekly video recap of the European Union Twittersphere, which originally ran on the EU public policy broadcaster platform ViEUws from October 2013 until March 2016. After ViEUws operations had to be reduced due to financial difficulties, Tweets of the Week was cancelled. In 2017 Euractiv revived it, starting in May that same year.

She was named by Onalytica as one of the world's Top 100 Influencers on Data Security 2016.

She is a member of the editorial advisory board of the Journal of Data Protection and Privacy – an academic publication that aims to be the gold standard in data protection, and is correspondent for the International Association of Privacy Professionals (IAPP) publications The Privacy Advisor and the Daily Dashboard.

She was a presenter at the Global Privacy Summit in Washington, D.C. in April 2016 on a panel with Chair of the EU Article 29 Working Party, Isabelle Falque-Pierrotin, and US Federal Trade Commission Chairwoman, Edith Ramirez. She regularly speaks at international conferences on the topic of Disinformation, Media and Digital Rights, including CPDP, Fair Trials and the Hungarian Helsinki Committee, Disinfo Lab 2019, and The British Legal Technology Forum 2019.

In November 2017, Baker was named by Politico as one of the Top 20 Women Shaping Brussels 2017. She was most recently named by ZN Consulting as the Number One EU Influencer on Tech Policy.
