= Mehdi Semsar =

Iranian Translator and Pharmacist

- مهدی سمسار
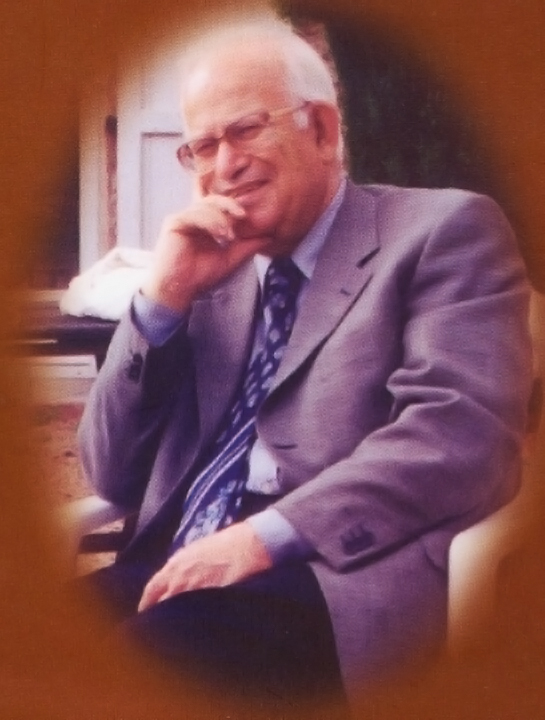
- Born: March 17, 1929; Bushehr, Iran
- Died: January 15, 2003 (aged 73); Paris, France
- Resting place: Montparnasse Cemetery
- Citizenship: Iran
- Education: Tehran University
- Spouse: Guity Elahi
- Children: Shireen Vernay, Shéhérazade Semsar de Boisséson

Mehdi Semsar (1929–2003) was a prominent Iranian journalist and translator.

== Life and career ==
Mehdi Semsar was born in 1929 in Bushehr a port of Persian Gulf. He passed his childhood and high school studies in Shiraz, the capital of Fars Province, in the south of Iran, and completed his university studies in Tehran University. At Tehran University, Mehdi Semsar entered the Faculty of Pharmacy and received his Ph.D. degree. Since he was extremely interested in journalism and because Kayhan Newspapers contracted him during his studies of pharmacology, he entered the Faculty of Journalism of Tehran University and received an M.A. in journalism. He continued his studies of journalism at the Institut Français de Presse in Paris (1969-1970). He left the Institut with an M.A. degree and was then accepted at Toulouse University for a Ph.D. degree in History of Journalism. He prepared his doctorate dissertation under the title of "Iranian Press during the Second World War".

Mehdi Semsar's professional life in journalism began actually in 1949 when Kayhan contracted him as their parliamentary correspondent. In 1954 he became Head of foreign news, in 1958 he was the Managing Editor, in 1962 Deputy Editor and in 1967 he was named Editor in Chief of Kayhan and Editor of Kayhan International (English Edition). In 1972, he became Vice-President the Kayhan Group of Newspapers. He left Kayhan in 1974 due to political pressures. In 1976 he became Director and Editor in Chief of the newly created newspaper Rastakhiz (Resurgence Party).

Mehdi Semsar died in Paris on January 15, 2003, and was buried at Montparnasse Cemetery.

== Other activities ==
By translating approximately fifty historical, political and cultural books, Mehdi Semsar greatly contributed to younger Iranian generations' understanding of world affairs and Western civilization. The translation was initially a hobby and became a full-time activity at the end of his life. Most of these translations included a long preface written by himself and explaining the interest of the book, author, or historical period.

== Omid Journalism Award ==
In 2007, Guity Elahi established the Omid Journalism Prize in memory of her husband Mehdi Semsar. The awardees have included Masih Alinejad and Hadi Heidari.
