= Paul Adamson =

British editor

Paul Adamson OBE
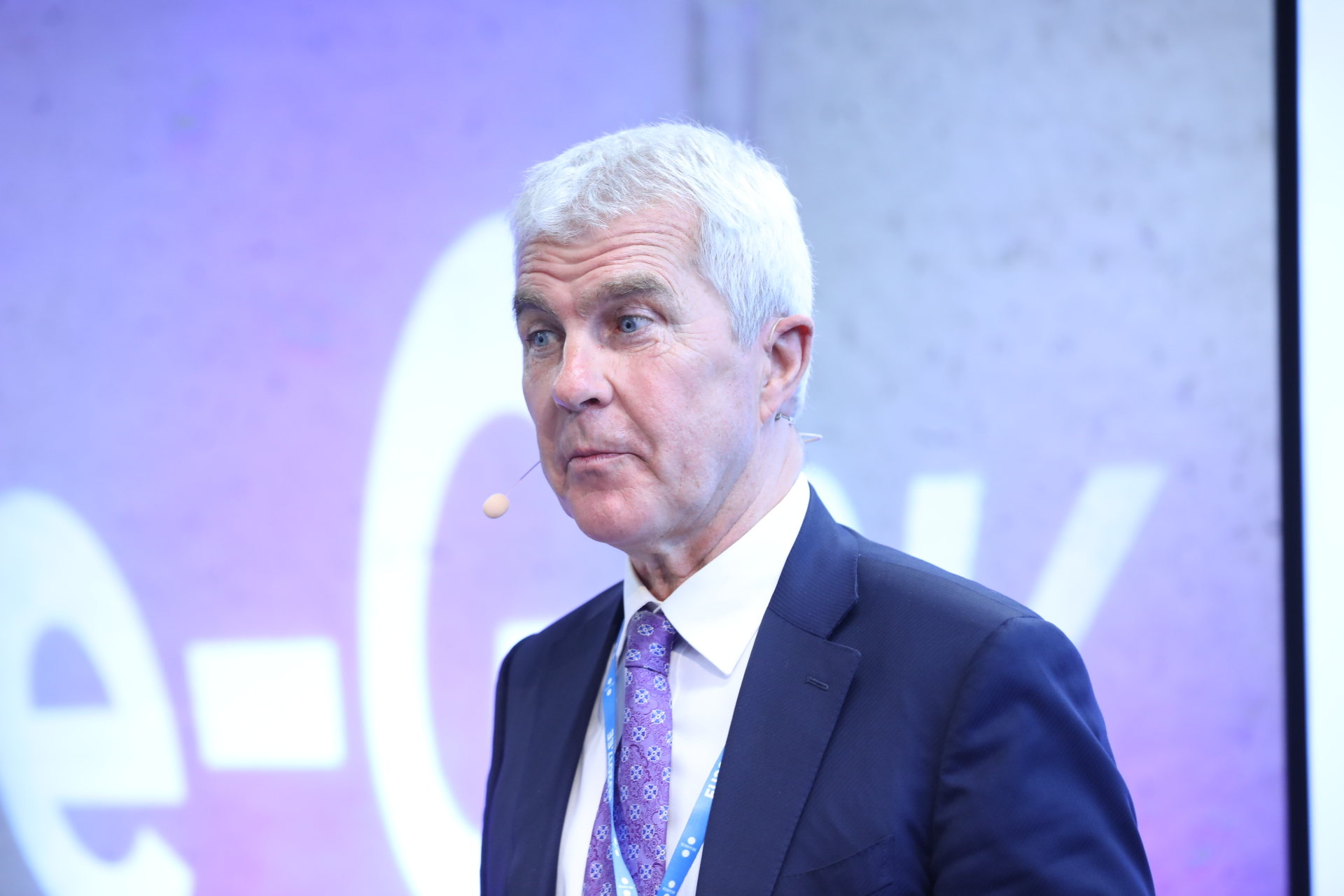
- Born: Chester, Cheshire, United Kingdom
- Spouse: Denyse Molaro (1978-)
- Children: 2

Paul Edward Adamson OBE is a British editor and the chairman of Forum Europe and founder of E!Sharp. Adamson has also been involved in other organizations, including Rand Europe, YouGov-Cambridge, and Covington. He was made an Officer of the Order of the British Empire in 2012 and Chevalier in the Ordre national du Mérite by the French government in 2016.

== Early life ==
Adamson was born in Chester, Cheshire, United Kingdom. He is married to Denyse Molaro, and has two children. He resides in Brussels, Belgium.

== Career ==
Adamson founded E!Sharp, an online magazine dedicated to covering the European Union and Europe's place in the world. He was a Senior European Policy Advisor at Covington, a member of Rand Europe's Council of Advisors

Adamson is a visiting professor at the Policy Institute, King's College London. He founded the consulting firm Adamson Associates, which was sold to Weber Shandwick and The Centre and was later sold to Edelman. In 2012, Adamson was made an Officer of the Order of the British Empire “for services to promoting understanding of the European Union”, a part of the Queen's 2012 New Year Honours Diplomatic Service and Overseas List. In 2016 he was made a Chevalier in the Ordre national du Mérite by the French government.
