= Shéhérazade Semsar-de Boisséson =

Franco-Iranian executive

- Born: 27 December 1968 (age 57); Tehran, Imperial State of Iran
- Citizenship: France
- Education: Georgetown University, Washington DC

Shéhérazade Semsar-de Boisséson (born 27 December 1968) is a Franco-Iranian executive. She is the CEO of McCourt Global.

== Biography ==
Daughter of the journalist and Editor-in-Chief of Kayhan, Mehdi Semsar (1929–2003), and of Guity Elahi (founder of Omid Journalism Award), Semsar-de Boisséson is an alumna of Georgetown University School of Foreign Service, where she completed her bachelor's and master's degrees in 1990 at the age of 21 years old. She began her career at Ciba-Geigy in 1990.

In 1993, aged 23, she founded Development Institute International (DII), one of France's leading conference providers. In 2013, she acquired European Voice from the Economist Group. As publisher and owner of European Voice] she relaunched its website and created new services. In December 2014, POLITICO and Axel Springer acquired European Voice and DII. Semsar-de Boisséson became the CEO of POLITICO in Europe.

In June 2021, Semsar-de Boisséson stepped down at her request as CEO of POLITICO Europe and joined the advisory board of the publication. In November 2021 she became the Inaugural Executive Director of the McCourt Institute, an academic partnership between the McCourt School of Public Policy at Georgetown University and Sciences Po in France.

In January 2023, she became the CEO of McCourt Global, a private family company founded by Frank McCourt with business interests across real estate, sports, media, finance and technology.

=== Personal life ===
Semsar-de Boisséson is married to Laurent de Boisséson. They have three children: Inès, Louise and Cyrus.

== Other activities ==
Semsar-de Boisséson served on the Board of Directors of Georgetown University from 2013 to 2019. She is serving on the advisory board of Georgetown Institute for Women, Peace and Security. She is also a member of the Board of Directors of the French-American Foundation, the Board of Directors of My Stealthy Freedom and member of the supervisory board of the soccer team Olympique de Marseille.

Semsar-de Boisséson serves on the Executive Advisory Board of the World.Minds Foundation, contributing to interdisciplinary discussions on media, policy, and innovation.
