= EUobserver =

European online newspaper

- Type: Online newspaper
- Owner: EUobserver.com ASBL
- Founder: Lisbeth Kirk
- Founded: 2000
- Website: euobserver.com

EUobserver is a European online newspaper, launched in 2000 by the Brussels-based organisation EUobserver.com ASBL.

The newspaper provides both daily reports and in-depth coverage on international affairs related to the European Union (EU). It is regarded as one of the first English language media outlets dedicated to the reporting of EU affairs, since joined by The Brussels Times, EURACTIV and Politico Europe.

== Organisation ==
The website was first launched in 2000 by Lisbeth Kirk, a Danish journalist.

There is much academic debate over whether EUobserver, along with other similar publications, can be considered to be contributing to the creation of a pan-European public sphere.

Kirk served as both editor-in-chief and business chief of the paper until 2015, after which she was replaced by Eric Maurice, who took over as editor-in-chief of the publication. In 2019, Koert Debeuf was appointed as new editor-in-chief of EUobserver. The current editor-in-chief is Elena Sánchez Nicolás.

In February 2026, EUobserver underwent a major structural change when it was acquired by Denník N, retaining its editorial independence. Denník N is a leading independent Central European publishing house, publishing in Slovak, Czech and Hungarian languages – read by millions every month.

== Readership ==
In a 2008 poll of 100 Brussels-based journalists by APCO, one third claimed to use the publication as their source for EU news, making it, at the time, the "second most influential" media outlet reporting on EU affairs behind the Financial Times. Also, in a 2016 media survey, conducted by ComRes and Burson-Marsteller on 'What Influences the Influencers', it was found that EUobserver tended to be the preferred source of news for EU officials.

Since EUobserver is an online medium, with the exception of its quarterly magazine editions, it relies on a growing social media following on Twitter, Facebook and LinkedIn, reaching 330,000 followers in 2019.

== See also ==
- E!Sharp
- EURACTIV
- Euronews
- EU Scream
- Politico Europe
- The Brussels Times
- Voxeurop
