= Politico Europe =

European edition of American news organization Politico

- Type: News media
- Owner: Axel Springer SE
- Editor: Kate Day
- Founded: 2015; 11 years ago
- Language: English
- Headquarters: Politico Europe, Rue de la Loi 62, 1040 Brussels
- Website: politico.eu

Politico Europe (stylized as POLITICO Europe) is the European edition of the American news organization Politico reporting on political affairs of the European Union. Its headquarters are located in Brussels with additional offices in London, Berlin, Warsaw, Paris, and Frankfurt.

In September 2014, Politico formed a joint venture with German publisher Axel Springer SE to launch its European edition. In December 2014, the joint venture announced its acquisition, from Shéhérazade Semsar- de Boisséson, of Development Institute International, a leading French conference business, and European Voice, a European political newspaper previously part of the Economist Group, to be relaunched under the Politico brand. Among the participants of the launch event on April 21, 2015, was President of the European Council Donald Tusk and President of the European Parliament Martin Schulz.

Politico Europe debuted with its first print issue two days later, on April 23, 2015. The main sources of revenue are advertising, event sponsorship and paid subscriptions with nearly half coming from the subscription business.

In June 2018, the second year in a row, the annual ComRes/Burson-Marsteller survey among EU experts named Politico Europe as the most influential publication on European affairs. Despite its relative newness to the Brussels media landscape, Politico Europe has ranked above established publications such as the Financial Times, The Economist, BBC and the Wall Street Journal, as well as Twitter and Facebook. In August 2021, Axel Springer SE signed an agreement to acquire Politico, including the remaining 50 percent share of its current joint venture Politico Europe, as well as the tech news website Protocol from Robert Allbritton for an estimated value of $1 billion. In October 2025, Euractiv reported that European security services were investigating a former Politico reporter for working as a spy for the People's Republic of China.

== Politico Pro ==
Politico Pro is a premium politics and policy news service that launched in 2015. The newsletter based subscriptions cover different policy areas such as Agriculture and Food, Financial Services, Healthcare, Trade, Energy and Climate, Technology and Transportation. There are also products that are less industry focused but instead provide information on a certain topic like Brexit, sustainability, data and digitization, the EU Budget or competition. In April 2018, Politico Europe added DataPoint, a research platform that gives subscribers access to presentations and analysis about topics from various policy areas, to its subscription portfolio. Politico Pro's paid offerings reach 45.000 subscribers. Subscription prices start at 7000 euros a year, but can also be in the high five-digit range.

In July 2018, Politico Europe announced the acquisition of technology from Statehill Inc, and the subsequent launch of a data-driven information platform, Pro Intelligence.

== Brussels Playbook ==
In March 2018, Florian Eder took over the flagship morning newsletter Brussels Playbook from Ryan Heath, who authored the Brussels Playbook for three years. In September 2017, Politico Europe launched the London Playbook morning newsletter with Jack Blanchard as the lead writer. Brussels Playbook has around 100,000 subscribers, London Playbook has 40,000 subscribers.

In September 2021, Irish journalist Suzanne Lynch and Politico reporter Jakob Hanke Vela replaced Florian Eder, as authors of the Brussels Playbook.

== Class of the Year ==
Each year Politico Europe releases a list of the 28 most powerful figures in European politics. It is usually divided between nine Doers, nine Disrupters, nine Dreamers and electing "the Most Powerful Person in Europe".

| Class | Most Powerful Person in Europe | | | #1 Doer | | | #1 Disrupter | | | #1 Dreamer | | | Source |
|---|---|---|---|---|---|---|---|---|---|---|---|---|---|
| Class of 2025 | (Italy) Giorgia Meloni | Prime Minister of Italy | Conservative | (Germany) Ursula von der Leyen | President of the European Commission | Christian Democrat | (Germany) Friedrich Merz | Leader of the Christian Democratic Union | Christian Democrat | (Netherlands) Mark Rutte | Secretary General of NATO | Liberal | |
| Class of 2024 | (Poland) Donald Tusk | Prime Minister of Poland | Christian Democrat | (Italy) Giorgia Meloni | Prime Minister of Italy | Conservative | (Russia) Elvira Nabiullina | Governor of the Central Bank of Russia | | (Ukraine) Volodymyr Zelenskyy | President of Ukraine | Liberal | |
| Class of 2023 | (Ukraine) Volodymyr Zelenskyy | President of Ukraine | Liberal | (Germany) Robert Habeck | Vice-Chancellor of Germany | Green | (Italy) Giorgia Meloni | Prime Minister of Italy | Conservative | (Finland) Sanna Marin | Prime Minister of Finland | Social Democrat | |
| Class of 2022 | (Italy) Mario Draghi | Prime Minister of Italy | | (Germany) Olaf Scholz | Chancellor of Germany | Social Democrat | (Poland) Donald Tusk | Leader of the Civic Platform | Christian Democrat | (France) Anne Hidalgo | Mayor of Paris | Social Democrat | |
| Class of 2021 | (Germany) Angela Merkel | Chancellor of Germany | Christian Democrat | (Italy) Giuseppe Conte | Prime Minister of Italy | | (Russia) Pavel Durov | CEO of Telegram | | (Germany) Ursula von der Leyen | President of the European Commission | Christian Democrat | |
| Class of 2020 | (France) Emmanuel Macron | President of France | Liberal | (Denmark) Margrethe Vestager | European Commissioner for Competition | Liberal | (United Kingdom) Dominic Cummings | Chief Adviser to the UK Prime Minister | Conservative | (Sweden) Greta Thunberg | Climate Activist | | |
| Class of 2019 | (Italy) Matteo Salvini | Deputy Prime Minister of Italy | Nationalist | (Norway) Ine Eriksen Søreide | Norwegian Minister of Foreign Affairs | Christian Democrat | (Republic of Ireland) Mary Lou McDonald | President of Sinn Féin | Leftist | (France) Garance Pineau | Head of European Affairs at LREM | Liberal | |
| Class of 2018 | (Germany) Christian Lindner | Leader of the Free Democratic Party | Liberal | | | | | | | | | | |
| Class of 2017 | (United Kingdom) Sadiq Khan | Mayor of London | Social Democrat | | | | | | | | | | |
| Class of 2016 | (Hungary) Viktor Orbán | Prime Minister of Hungary | Christian Democrat | | | | | | | | | | |

== People ==
Kate Day was appointed Senior Executive Editor of the European operation of Politico in late 2024. Jamil Anderlini was appointed Politico's Editor in Chief in Europe in 2021. In late 2024 it was announced that Anderlini would move into the role of Regional Director of POLITICO's European operation. In November 2024, Julia Wehrle was appointed to the role of Chief Revenue Officer for Europe. Previous top editors included Stephen Brown who was named Executive Editor in September 2019, and Matthew Kaminski who is now Politico's editor-at-large, based in Washington. Brown died suddenly of a heart attack on March 18, 2021. Shéhérazade Semsar de-Boisséson was the founding CEO until she stepped down at her own request and was replaced by Claire Boussagol. Following Axel Springer's acquisition of Politico in 2022, Goli Sheikholeslami was appointed as global CEO of the Politico media group.

== Profile ==
The majority of the publication's articles cover the day-to-day business of the European Commission, the European Parliament, the Council of the European Union and the EU's interactions in domestic and international affairs. Politico Europe also publishes profiles of important or influential public figures within the European Union. Politico Europe also organizes and hosts EU-related conferences, seminars, and debates.

== See also ==
- Axel Springer SE
- EUobserver
- Euractiv
- Europe Elects
- The Brussels Times
- Voxeurop
