= Europe Elects =

European election watchdog

- Website type: Data journalism
- Available in: English
- Headquarters: Oberroßbach, Germany
- Area served: Europe
- Founder: Tobias Gerhard Schminke
- Editor: Julius Lehtinen
- Key people: Jakub Rogowiecki (Executive Project Manager)
- Industry: Data analysis; Journalism; Opinion polling
- Website: europeelects.eu
- Registration: October 2019
- Launched: May 2014
- Current status: Active

Europe Elects is a political intelligence platform and poll aggregator.

== History and activities ==
Europe Elects, initially founded as a Twitter account in 2014, pioneered linking national voting intentions to European Parliament party groups.

Since then, Europe Elects has expanded into a data and media project that aggregates opinion polls and election results from all independent European states. The organization has published monthly European Parliament seat projections since 2014, making it one of the longest-running and most consistent sources for such projections.

=== Democracy Watchdog ===
Europe Elects reported statistical anomalies – typically associated with electoral fraud – in the 2024 Georgian parliamentary election and the 2025 Georgian local elections. Kakha Kaladze, Secretary General of the governing Georgian Dream party, rejected the allegations of falsification.

A November 2025 report by the Georgian Electoral Commission accused Europe Elects of spreading misinformation about the elections. The report also criticized President Salomé Zourabichvili – a prominent critic of the government – as well as opposition parties and independent media for their commentary on the electoral process. The Georgian Dream government has, in recent years, faced criticism for increasing authoritarian tendencies and weaponizing state institutions against political opponents.

In previous years, Europe Elects has republished analyses from election-monitoring organizations operating in authoritarian contexts, such as the now-defunct Russia-based Golos.

The platform provides a list of European polling firms engaged in political polling, highlighting their past performance and potential conflicts of interest.

== Spread and perception ==
Europe Elects is considered a major media source concerning the European Parliament and electoral analysis in Europe. According to an analysis by Bayerischer Rundfunk, Europe Elects was the most-cited Twitter account reporting on the European Parliament election, beating established media such as the BBC or Le Monde. It is quoted frequently in both European and worldwide publications, is referenced by the Centre for European Policy Studies, and is listed in the database of the European Data Journalism Network, a consortium of media and journalists promoting data-driven multilingual coverage of European topics.

In 2019, Euronews published Europe Elects European Parliament projections. In 2021, Europe Elects collaborated with Euractiv and Decision Desk HQ.

In 2024, Süddeutsche Zeitung described the project as having "changed Europe's democracy to some extent."

== Awards ==
In 2022, Europe Elects was awarded the Dalhousie Impact Award. In 2024, Europe Elects received a grant from the Calouste Gulbenkian Foundation to fight misinformation and disinformation relating to political polls in Europe.

== See also ==
- EUobserver
- FiveThirtyEight
- Voxeurop
