= Rapporteur (online newspaper) =

European news website

- Type: News media
- Owner: Mediahuis
- Founded: 1999; 27 years ago
- Language: English, French, German, Spanish, Italian, Polish, Slovak, Czech, Greek, Bulgarian and Romanian
- Headquarters: Brussels, Belgium
- Country: Belgium, France, United Kingdom, Germany, Spain, Italy, Poland, Slovakia, Czech Republic, Greece, Bulgaria, Romania and Croatia
- Website: www.rapporteur.com

Rapporteur, formerly known as Euractiv, is a European news website focused on EU policies, founded in 1999 by the French media publisher Christophe Leclercq. Its headquarters and central editorial staff are located in Brussels, with other offices in Paris and Berlin. Its content is produced by about 50 journalists staffed in Belgium, Bulgaria, the Czech Republic, France, Germany, Greece, Italy, Poland, Romania and Slovakia.

Rapporteur has diversified sources of funding, as the company seeks private and public revenues to run its business. In 2019, about a fifth of Rapporteur's income came from public sources, including the EU.

In May 2023, Rapporteur (then Euractiv) was acquired by Belgian media company Mediahuis in what became the company's first international media platform acquisition.

On 29 September 2026, Euractiv changed its name to Rapporteur.

== Profile ==
Apart from daily articles, Rapporteur also produces special reports on specific policy topics. In 2016, the company introduced its flagship newsletter "The Brief". In 2019, it launched a new round of EU-focused newsletters: "The Capitals", the "Tech Brief", and the "Transport Brief". Furthermore, Rapporteur specializes in hosting events that bring key stakeholders together and into conversation. In 2018, Rapporteur organized more than 70 events, most of which were sponsored, mostly in the form of workshops or debates.

== Impact ==
According to the 2023 EU Media Poll conducted by Savanta for BCW Brussels, Rapporteur ranked as the fifth-most influential EU source, moving into the top 10 for the first time. In 2025, after ranking fifth again, Rapporteur itself raised doubts about the integrity of the EU Media Poll due to its small sample size.

In 2022, a study conducted by the Council of the European Union ranked Rapporteur second on the list of the most influential media outlets among Members of the European Parliament (MEPs).

== See also ==
- EUobserver
- Euronews
- Europe Elects
- Politico Europe
- Voxeurop
