= Opinion polling for the 2021 Norwegian parliamentary election =

In the run up to the 2021 Norwegian parliamentary election, various organisations carried out opinion polling to gauge voting intention in Norway. Results of such polls are displayed in this article.

The date range for these opinion polls are from the previous general election, held on 11 September 2017, to 13 September 2021, the day of the election. Unlike most nations, Norway's constitution does not allow early elections before the four-year term limit.

== Poll results ==
=== Graphical summary ===
There were several websites tracking party support ahead of the election, using somewhat different methods. Below is a plot of the 30-day moving average of relevant opinion polls.

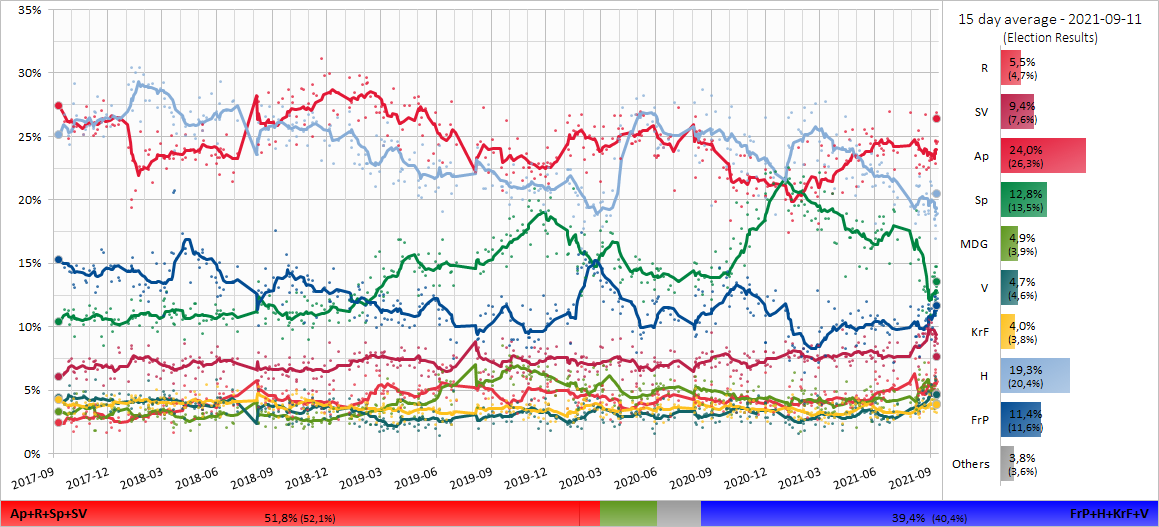

=== 2021 ===
Polling firm	Fieldwork date	Sample size	Resp.	R	SV	MDG	Ap	Sp	V	KrF	H	FrP	Others	Lead
2021 election	13 Sep 2021	—	77.2	4.7	7.6	3.9	26.3	13.5	4.6	3.8	20.4	11.6	3.6 (Note: Pasientfokus won one regional seat in Finnmark where it received 12.7% of the vote (which is 0.2% nationally).)	5.9
Kantar TNS	9–11 Sep 2021	2,088	–	5.7	8.7	5.1	24.6	12.7	4.5	3.8	19.0	12.3	3.6	5.6
Opinion Perduco	10 Sep 2021 (Note: Date of publication of poll; fieldwork date unknown.)	–	–	4.6	7.7	4.8	26.9	14.8	4.5	3.3	18.9	11.9	2.5	8.0
Kantar TNS	8–10 Sep 2021	2,388	83.6	5.9	9.1	4.9	24.5	13.2	4.4	4.2	19.4	11.3	3.3	5.1
Kantar TNS	7–9 Sep 2021	2,387	81.4	6.7	9.2	4.7	23.9	12.7	4.8	4.9	19.1	10.9	3.3	4.8
Norfakta	7–8 Sep 2021	1,003	84.0	5.4	8.2	5.9	24.0	14.8	3.8	3.6	19.1	11.8	3.5	4.9
Ipsos MMI	6–8 Sep 2021	–	–	6.0	11.8	4.3	22.9	12.2	6.1	4.2	17.0	11.8	3.7	5.9
Norstat	4–8 Sep 2021	–	–	4.6	9.0	4.9	24.6	11.6	5.8	3.9	18.8	11.9	4.9	5.8
Respons Analyse	3–8 Sep 2021	1,000	–	6.0	9.4	4.2	26.6	11.1	3.9	4.5	18.0	12.4	3.9	8.6
Kantar TNS	3–8 Sep 2021	2,582	–	6.4	9.3	4.7	23.7	13.4	4.6	4.5	19.1	11.2	3.5 (Note: Democrats in Norway 0.9%, The Christians 0.6%, Pensioners' Party 0.4%, Capitalist Party 0.2%, Coastal Party 0.1%)	4.6
Norstat	31 Aug–8 Sep 2021	11,500	–	4.9	8.9	4.9	24.7	11.9	4.9	4.2	20.4	12.0	3.1	4.3
Kantar TNS	1–7 Sep 2021	2,184	–	6.2	8.9	5.0	23.8	13.8	4.8	4.3	18.6	11.1	3.5 (Note: Democrats in Norway 1.1%, The Christians 1.0%, Pensioners' Party 0.4%, Capitalist Party 0.2%, Coastal Party 0.1%, FNB 0.1%)	5.2
Kantar TNS	1–6 Sep 2021	1,686	–	5.6	9.5	4.7	23.3	14.0	4.7	4.1	19.4	10.9	3.8 (Note: Democrats in Norway 1.3%, The Christians 0.6%, Pensioners' Party 0.4%, Capitalist Party 0.3%, Coastal Party 0.1%, FNB 0.1%)	3.9
Norstat	30 Aug–6 Sep 2021	969	–	5.2	8.6	5.4	23.9	14.3	3.6	3.4	18.5	12.4	4.7	5.4
Kantar TNS	25 Aug–3 Sep 2021	1,388	–	5.4	9.4	4.3	23.4	14.0	4.6	3.6	20.5	10.0	4.9 (Note: Democrats in Norway 1.6%, The Christians 0.7%, Pensioners' Party 0.6%, Capitalist Party 0.4%, Coastal Party 0.4%)	2.9
Kantar TNS	27 Aug–2 Sep 2021	1,480	–	5.1	9.5	5.0	23.2	12.4	4.8	4.3	21.2	9.0	5.4	2.0
Respons Analyse	27 Aug–1 Sep 2021	1,000	81.0	4.6	10.4	4.9	23.2	12.6	5.5	3.6	20.1	11.5	3.6	3.1
Kantar TNS	25–31 Aug 2021	1,200	–	4.9	9.7	5.0	23.4	11.0	4.8	4.1	21.5	10.7	4.9 (Note: Democrats in Norway 1.5%, The Christians 1.3%, Pensioners' Party 0.5%, Capitalist Party 0.5%, Coastal Party 0.1%)	1.9
Norstat	23–29 Aug 2021	–	–	5.0	10.6	4.8	23.1	12.2	4.5	4.7	19,6	11.3	3.9	3.5
Norstat	24–28 Aug 2021	962	–	5.4	10.0	5.8	23.7	12.6	4.9	3.7	19.0	11.5	3.4	4.7
Kantar TNS	23–27 Aug 2021	996	–	7.2	10.2	5.0	22.6	11.5	4.4	3.8	19.2	11.8	4.3 (Note: Democrats in Norway 1.5%, The Christians 0.9%, Pensioners' Party 0.7%, Capitalist Party 0.2%)	3.4
Kantar TNS	22–25 Aug 2021	–	–	6.3	9.9	5.3	22.4	11.2	4.8	3.7	20.5	10.7	5.2	1.9
Sentio	17–21 Aug 2021	1,000	–	5.4	8.8	7.2	23.9	13.2	3.8	3.9	19.1	9.8	4.9	4.8
Norstat	16–22 Aug 2021	–	–	4.7	9.5	5.3	26.8	12.8	3.8	3.6	18.9	10.5	4.2	7.9
Kantar TNS	16–20 Aug 2021	992	81.7	5.9	9.5	5.1	22.7	13.0	4.4	3.4	19.7	9.3	7.0 (Note: Democrats in Norway 2.4%, Capitalist Party 1.0%, The Christians 0.6%, Pensioners' Party 0.4%, FNB 0.2%, Health Party 0.1%, Coastal Party 0.1%)	3.0
Respons Analyse	13–18 Aug 2021	1,001	–	4.7	9.5	5.8	24.9	11.3	5.0	4.2	20.3	11.6	2.7	4.6
Norstat	10–13 Aug 2021	948	–	3.2	7.6	6.7	22.1	17.1	4.1	2.9	21.9	8.6	5.8	0.2
Kantar TNS	9–13 Aug 2021	983	–	5.1	9.3	6.3	22.8	13.7	3.4	5.1	21.2	7.7	5.6	1.6
Norstat	28 Jul–11 Aug 2021	11,400	–	4.9	6.9	4.3	25.5	16.2	3.3	3.1	21.1	10.9	3.9	4.4
Norstat	6–11 Aug 2021	1,000	79.0	4.6	8.6	5.9	24.0	16.1	4.3	3.2	19.1	10.1	4.1	4.9
Respons Analyse	5–11 Aug 2021	1,000	–	4.3	9.4	5.1	24.8	15.3	4.0	3.3	18.9	11.4	3.5	5.9
Opinion Perduco	3–8 Aug 2021	964	76.0	3.8	8.8	3.5	22.6	19.2	3.8	4.0	21.2	9.3	3.8	1.4
Kantar TNS	2–6 Aug 2021	977	-	7.5	8.6	4.5	23.5	16.4	3.2	3.8	18.2	9.3	5.0	5.3
Norstat	22–28 Jul 2021	1,000	74.0	5.5	8.0	4.1	26.9	15.0	3.6	3.0	19.5	11.6	2.8	7.4
Norfakta	6–7 Jul 2021	1,000	77.0	6.0	8.8	3.9	23.8	16.9	4.0	3.1	20.2	10.3	3.0	3.6
Kantar TNS	28 Jun–2 Jul 2021	982	–	5.4	7.3	4.9	22.4	19.1	2.8	3.8	19.7	10.6	4.1	2.7
Ipsos MMI	28–30 Jun 2021	1,000	–	5.5	6.6	5.0	23.9	19.3	3.4	2.7	20.7	7.2	5.7 (Note: Democrats in Norway 3.1%)	3.2
Norstat	17–23 Jun 2021	1,000	75.0	4.9	8.8	4.2	27.0	15.0	2.5	3.5	21.1	9.4	3.5	5.9
Norstat	15–20 Jun 2021	930	–	5.8	8.4	2.8	24.9	17.5	2.6	2.7	22.1	9.6	3.5	2.8
Respons Analyse	9–14 Jun 2021	1.000	–	4.5	8.2	3.7	23.6	18.2	2.8	3.3	21.4	10.5	3.7	2.2
Sentio	8–13 Jun 2021	1,000	–	4.8	7.0	5.0	23.9	18.7	2.8	3.3	21.9	10.1	2.4	2.0
Norstat	26 May–11 Jun 2021	11,400	–	4.2	7.8	3.7	24.1	17.7	2.7	3.6	23.0	10.2	3.2	1.1
Opinion Perduco	1–7 Jun 2021	964	74.0	4.7	6.1	4.7	24.3	18.7	2.3	3.7	22.8	10.3	2.5	1.5
Norfakta	31 May–4 Jun 2021	–	–	5.6	8.1	4.0	23.5	17.6	2.9	2.9	22.3	10.9	2.3	1.2
Norstat	25–31 May 2021	953	–	5.9	7.3	4.2	24.7	17.0	3.1	3.0	21.2	10.7	3.0	3.3
Kantar TNS	25–31 May 2021	1,179	–	6.5	8.5	4.5	24.5	17.5	4.1	3.4	18.2	9.8	2.7	6.5
Ipsos MMI	24–26 May 2021	1,000	74.0	4.0	7.6	4.7	25.7	16.4	2.6	3.3	21.1	10.1	4.5	4.6
Norstat	18–25 May 2021	967	–	4.9	7.5	2.6	25.0	16.2	2.7	3.6	23.7	9.9	4.0	1.3
Norstat	20–24 May 2021	999	–	3.9	7.8	5.3	24.5	16.2	3.2	2.9	22.8	10.9	2.6	1.7
Sentio	11–16 May 2021	1,000	–	4.6	7.3	5.1	25.3	14.6	3.4	3.8	22.1	12.0	1.7	3.2
Opinion Perduco	13 May 2021	–	–	4.4	9.3	5.0	25.6	16.3	3.3	4.1	22.0	8.7	1.4	3.6
Respons Analyse	5–10 May 2021	1,001	–	4.0	8.0	4.2	21.5	18.3	3.6	4.1	22.0	10.8	3.5	0.5
Norfakta	4–5 May 2021	1,000	–	4.2	8.0	3.8	24.4	14.8	3.9	3.9	23.9	10.0	3.1	0.5
Norstat	27 April–3 May 2021	958	–	4.4	8.8	4.0	23.1	17.5	3.1	4.2	21.1	11.3	2.4	2.0
Kantar TNS	26–30 Apr 2021	976	–	4.6	8.1	2.1	21.1	18.4	4.1	4.5	24.3	8.6	4.1	3.2
Ipsos MMI	26–28 Apr 2021	1,000	73.0	4.5	8.5	3.9	23.5	17.5	3.7	4.0	20.4	9.5	4.5	3.1
Norstat	20–24 Apr 2021	963	–	3.7	7.4	3.6	25.6	17.8	3.1	3.8	21.8	10.0	3.2	3.8
Norstat	7–20 Apr 2021	11,413	–	3.7	7.0	3.9	23.3	17.1	2.9	3.4	24.7	11.1	3.0	1.4
Sentio	13–19 Apr 2021	1,000	–	4.1	7.3	4.4	24.8	17.1	2.9	3.1	24.1	10.0	2.1	0.7
Opinion Perduco	14 Apr 2021	–	–	4.0	7.7	5.7	23.1	19.0	3.3	3.1	21.7	9.5	3.0	1.4
Respons Analyse	7–12 Apr 2021	1,000	75.0	4.8	7.7	4.4	25.4	14.0	3.2	3.2	26.6	8.3	2.4	1.2
Norfakta	6–7 Apr 2021	1,000	74.0	4.0	9.8	4.1	22.5	18.8	1.9	2.4	24.2	10.5	1.7	1.7
Kantar TNS	29 Mar–7 Apr 2021	1,002	–	4.0	8.4	4.3	20.6	18.7	2.3	4.1	24.2	10.2	2.7	3.6
Norstat	23–28 Mar 2021	968	–	3.8	6.9	4.9	23.3	16.6	4.0	3.2	25.2	10.2	1.8	1.9
Ipsos MMI	22–24 Mar 2021	1,000	77.0	4.9	7.4	3.4	24.3	16.7	2.9	2.9	20.9	11.5	5.1	3.4
Norstat	16–21 Mar 2021	961	–	4.1	7.5	3.3	20.5	20.5	2.4	4.1	23.8	9.9	4.1	3.3
Sentio	9–14 Mar 2021	1,000	–	4.1	7.8	3.3	23.5	18.6	2.9	2.4	22.7	12.0	2.7	0.8
Respons Analyse	5–10 Mar 2021	1,001	–	4.7	7.7	3.6	22.2	18.6	3.3	2.5	27.8	7.8	1.8	5.6
Opinion Perduco	1–8 Mar 2021	966	72.0	4.9	7.8	4.1	22.7	20.7	2.2	2.9	22.8	9.2	2.6	0.1
Norfakta	2–3 Mar 2021	1,000	–	3.8	7.5	3.5	24.3	17.7	3.9	2.7	23.9	10.0	2.9	0.4
Norstat	22–28 Feb 2021	957	–	2.8	7.4	3.9	21.0	22.2	2.8	3.9	24.6	9.7	1.6	2.4
Kantar TNS	22–26 Feb 2021	981	–	6.8	8.6	4.0	18.2	19.2	2.9	3.3	25.6	7.2	4.2	6.4
Ipsos MMI	22–24 Feb 2021	1,000	75.5	2.7	7.8	3.7	20.3	17.7	4.6	3.3	23.1	12.9	3.9	2.8
Norstat	15–21 Feb 2021	961	–	4.8	6.1	5.2	20.6	18.6	2.3	3.6	27.6	8.3	3.0	7.0
Sentio	9–14 Feb 2021	1,000	–	3.8	8.6	4.7	21.0	18.4	2.7	3.3	26.9	7.5	3.0	5.9
Opinion Perduco	1–8 Feb 2021	964	–	2.9	7.4	4.0	24.6	19.1	3.2	3.2	25.1	8.1	2.5	0.5
Norfakta	2–3 Feb 2021	1,000	–	3.8	7.5	5.0	21.3	19.7	4.0	2.7	27.3	6.4	2.3	6.0
Respons Analyse	27 Jan–2 Feb 2021	1,000	–	4.2	7.3	3.8	22.8	18.8	1.9	3.4	26.3	8.7	2.8	3.5
Norstat	25–31 Jan 2021	945	74.7	3.9	8.3	4.8	20.7	21.9	2.4	3.5	22.8	8.3	3.3	0.9
Kantar TNS	25–29 Jan 2021	974	76.2	5.2	5.9	5.0	20.0	19.9	4.2	2.8	25.3	7.7	4.1	5.3
Ipsos MMI	25–27 Jan 2021	1,000	73.4	5.3	7.7	1.8	20.4	21.4	2.5	2.9	25.4	9.5	3.1	4.0
Norstat	18–24 Jan 2021	954	–	3.8	7.6	3.0	24.2	19.6	1.6	2.7	25.6	10.0	1.9	1.4
Sentio	12–16 Jan 2021	1,000	–	3.3	7.8	6.4	21.3	19.6	2.6	2.9	23.0	8.4	4.6	1.8
InFact	13 Jan 2021	3,245	–	4.0	8.7	5.8	18.4	20.5	2.1	4.7	24.1	8.6	3.1	3.6
Opinion Perduco	13 Jan 2021	–	–	4.4	8.0	3.4	19.0	20.1	2.7	3.4	26.9	9.8	2.3	6.8
Kantar TNS	4–8 Jan 2021	976	–	5.3	7.6	3.4	22.4	21.7	2.3	3.3	24.2	7.4	2.2	1.8
Norfakta	5–6 Jan 2021	1,001	78.0	3.1	8.2	4.5	17.5	22.6	2.7	3.4	24.3	11.1	2.6	1.7
Respons Analyse	4–6 Jan 2021	1,000	–	3.4	7.7	3.8	20.5	19.2	3.4	3.4	26.5	9.3	2.8	6.0
Norstat	28 Dec 2020–2 Jan 2021	962	–	3.7	8.9	3.9	20.1	21.3	2.5	3.7	22.6	11.3	2.0	1.3
2017 election	11 Sep 2017	—	78.3	2.4	6.0	3.2	27.4	10.3	4.4	4.2	25.0	15.2	1.7	2.4

=== 2020 ===
Polling firm	Fieldwork date	Sample size	Resp.	R	SV	MDG	Ap	Sp	V	KrF	H	FrP	Others	Lead
Ipsos MMI	14–16 Dec 2020	1,000	73.2	3.7	7.5	3.9	21.1	22.3	3.5	3.8	18.9	12.9	2.4	1.2
Norstat	7–13 Dec 2020	952	–	3.3	8.0	3.8	21.4	21.3	3.1	3.8	21.8	12.1	1.4	0.4
Opinion Perduco	1–7 Dec 2020	962	72.0	3.8	6.9	4.5	21.8	22.2	2.4	3.4	22.9	10.9	1.3	0.7
Norfakta	1–2 Dec 2020	1,000	81.0	4.1	7.1	4.3	21.1	20.1	2.9	2.6	23.0	12.4	2.4	1.9
Kantar TNS	24–30 Nov 2020	984	81.0	6.4	8.1	4.0	20.4	22.1	4.0	3.3	20.2	8.8	2.8	1.7
Respons Analyse	25–30 Nov 2020	1,000	–	3.7	8.1	4.5	20.3	20.5	4.1	3.8	22.9	10.9	1.2	2.4
Sentio	24–29 Nov 2020	1,000	–	4.0	7.0	4.0	22.4	18.4	2.9	3.4	26.5	8.8	2.6	4.1
Ipsos MMI	16–18 Nov 2020	1,000	70.2	3.1	7.4	5.3	21.5	18.6	4.6	3.4	20.4	11.9	3.8	1.1
Norstat	9–15 Nov 2020	952	–	4.0	7.4	4.2	20.9	19.3	3.0	2.9	21.9	12.6	3.7	1.0
Opinion Perduco	3–9 Nov 2020	969	–	4.2	8.1	5.0	20.4	17.8	3.4	4.2	24.6	10.9	1.5	4.2
Norfakta	3–4 Nov 2020	1,000	–	4.1	6.7	4.0	23.4	17.7	2.5	3.4	24.7	11.2	2.3	1.3
Sentio	27 Oct–3 Nov 2020	1,000	–	3.4	7.6	3.5	21.9	16.4	3.0	4.2	25.0	13.4	1.7	3.1
Respons Analyse	28–31 Oct 2020	1,000	–	4.1	5.7	4.9	22.0	18.9	3.9	3.5	21.6	13.9	1.5	0.4
Kantar TNS	26–30 Oct 2020	986	79.2	4.9	7.8	4.0	20.5	19.8	4.1	2.8	22.1	11.5	2.5	1.6
Norstat	20–25 Oct 2020	942	75.0	3.3	7.9	4.3	23.5	14.9	3.3	3.3	25.2	12.3	2.2	1.7
Ipsos MMI	19–21 Oct 2020	1,000	72.6	5.4	6.3	4.7	19.5	17.8	2.6	3.7	22.3	12.7	5.0	2.8
Norstat	12–18 Oct 2020	962	–	4.1	6.0	3.7	23.5	16.6	3.0	3.4	24.3	13.2	2.1	0.8
Sentio	6–12 Oct 2020	1,000	–	3.3	6.6	4.2	20.8	19.8	3.3	3.5	23.6	13.5	1.4	2.8
Norfakta	6–7 Oct 2020	1,001	77.0	4.4	6.6	5.6	21.0	17.0	3.9	3.4	22.9	13.1	2.0	1.9
Opinion Perduco	29 Sep–4 Oct 2020	955	–	4.6	7.3	3.1	22.0	14.2	4.2	2.9	27.4	12.5	1.8	5.4
Kantar TNS	28 Sep–2 Oct 2020	974	73.2	6.1	7.2	4.7	18.4	16.2	4.3	5.1	24.0	12.8	1.1	5.6
Respons Analyse	28–30 Sep 2020	1,001	–	4.3	8.1	4.6	22.7	14.0	3.6	3.1	26.5	11.6	1.5	3.8
Norstat	21–27 Sep 2020	956	72.8	5.2	7.1	4.9	21.7	13.1	3.6	3.0	24.1	14.4	2.9	2.4
Ipsos MMI	21–25 Sep 2020	713	–	3.6	8.4	3.5	22.4	15.2	3.6	4.6	22.7	13.9	2.4	0.3
Norstat	14–20 Sep 2020	948	–	3.4	7.8	4.2	22.6	14.3	3.2	4.1	25.3	13.3	1.8	2.7
Sentio	8–14 Sep 2020	1,000	–	4.0	7.2	4.3	21.8	14.6	2.6	3.5	24.8	14.7	2.4	3.0
Opinion Perduco	1–7 Sep 2020	975	–	4.4	6.9	7.5	19.9	16.0	2.5	3.9	27.0	10.3	1.7	7.1
Norfakta	1–2 Sep 2020	1,000	78.0	3.3	8.1	3.5	24.7	13.4	2.9	4.1	25.6	12.8	1.6	0.9
Kantar TNS	25 Aug–1 Sep 2020	1,182	79.6	5.5	9.6	5.7	24.7	13.6	3.2	3.9	19.6	11.4	2.8	5.1
Respons Analyse	26–31 Aug 2020	1,000	–	3.9	6.8	4.5	24.3	14.7	4.0	3.3	24.8	11.5	2.2	0.5
Norstat	24–31 Aug 2020	944	–	3.8	8.1	4.1	24.0	12.2	3.4	2.8	28.3	11.4	1.8	4.3
Norstat	17–23 Aug 2020	952	–	4.2	7.9	4.9	24.0	14.0	3.2	3.7	26.8	9.7	1.7	2.8
Ipsos MMI	17–19 Aug 2020	1,000	71.5	4.4	7.1	5.8	24.8	13.9	3.1	3.5	24.3	11.7	1.4	0.5
Sentio	11–16 Aug 2020	1,000	–	4.1	8.0	3.9	23.1	12.6	2.1	2.6	28.7	12.8	2.0	5.6
Respons Analyse	6–11 Aug 2020	1,001	–	3.8	7.6	5.2	25.5	14.4	3.6	3.9	23.0	10.4	2.6	2.5
Norstat	4–10 Aug 2020	950	–	3.8	6.8	4.7	24.2	13.8	2.8	4.1	24.7	13.0	2.2	0.5
Kantar TNS	4–7 Aug 2020	980	76.7	4.6	7.5	5.2	25.4	15.0	2.3	4.5	25.0	9.4	1.6	0.4
Norfakta	4–5 Aug 2020	1,001	–	4.1	7.2	6.1	26.6	13.2	2.5	3.6	23.5	12.5	0.7	3.1
InFact	4 Aug 2020	1,024	–	5.8	7.3	5.4	21.8	14.1	3.7	5.2	25.1	9.3	2.3	3.3
Opinion Perduco	29 Jul–3 Aug 2020	967	72.0	4.3	6.1	4.6	24.6	15.1	3.1	3.3	27.7	9.8	1.4	3.1
Norfakta	7–8 Jul 2020	1,000	–	4.2	6.9	4.9	27.3	13.7	3.5	3.8	23.9	10.5	1.2	3.4
Kantar TNS	24–30 Jun 2020	985	78.6	5.8	8.1	5.2	20.8	12.7	2.9	3.9	27.7	10.6	2.3	6.9
Ipsos MMI	22–24 Jun 2020	1,000	–	3.0	8.2	5.9	25.0	13.3	3.1	3.2	25.2	11.0	2.1	0.2
Norstat	15–21 Jun 2020	1,000	–	4.9	6.8	4.8	24.9	13.0	2.7	4.3	24.8	11.5	2.4	0.1
Sentio	9–13 Jun 2020	1,000	–	5.1	6.9	5.4	24.2	14.0	4.4	2.5	24.2	11.3	2.0	Tie
Opinion Perduco	2–8 Jun 2020	969	72.0	4.3	7.2	5.6	25.2	14.6	3.5	3.9	24.4	10.4	0.8	0.8
Respons Analyse	2–4 Jun 2020	1,002	–	4.7	6.8	5.3	23.5	14.5	3.1	3.7	24.2	12.4	1.8	0.7
Norfakta	2–3 Jun 2020	1,002	–	4.9	7.2	3.9	23.5	14.6	3.0	4.5	24.1	12.3	2.0	0.6
Norstat	26 May–1 Jun 2020	949	72.9	4.8	6.9	5.6	23.4	14.6	2.4	3.4	25.8	12.0	1.1	2.4
Kantar TNS	25–29 May 2020	982	78.6	4.7	7.3	4.8	23.5	13.8	1.6	3.5	27.3	11.9	1.7	3.8
Ipsos MMI	25–28 May 2020	905	77.6	3.8	7.6	6.2	25.5	13.0	3.6	2.6	25.4	10.0	2.3	0.1
Norstat	19–25 May 2020	957	–	4.6	5.5	5.0	25.8	15.0	2.0	3.2	26.2	12.1	0.6	0.4
Sentio	12–16 May 2020	1,000	–	3.3	7.1	4.4	25.5	13.5	3.3	4.0	26.0	11.0	2.0	0.5
Opinion Perduco	5–10 May 2020	970	–	3.7	6.6	5.6	26.7	12.0	2.7	3.6	28.3	9.6	1.3	1.6
Norfakta	5–6 May 2020	1,000	81.0	4.3	8.0	4.4	25.1	13.5	3.3	4.1	26.9	9.1	1.3	1.8
Respons Analyse	30 Apr–5 May 2020	1,000	–	3.5	6.2	5.0	27.0	14.7	3.0	3.6	26.5	9.4	1.1	0.5
Norstat	27 Apr–4 May 2020	957	74.4	3.3	6.6	5.2	24.7	15.3	3.1	3.2	26.5	10.1	1.8	1.8
Kantar TNS	27–29 Apr 2020	988	72.9	5.3	5.6	3.9	26.8	14.6	3.4	3.0	28.0	8.0	1.4	1.2
Norstat	20–26 Apr 2020	955	–	3.7	6.6	3.9	24.6	15.6	3.3	3.2	26.8	11.4	0.9	2.2
Ipsos MMI	20–22 Apr 2020	1,000	72.4	4.9	8.5	4.2	24.5	14.2	3.1	4.1	25.3	9.7	1.5	0.8
Sentio	14–20 Apr 2020	1,000	–	3.2	6.5	4.9	24.5	14.0	3.3	3.7	26.7	12.0	1.4	1.9
Opinion Perduco	31 Mar–5 Apr 2020	1,000	–	3.7	5.9	4.7	25.7	13.8	2.9	3.0	27.3	11.6	1.4	1.6
Norfakta	31 Mar–1 Apr 2020	1,000	–	2.5	9.1	5.0	23.3	14.7	3.3	4.1	25.9	11.1	1.0	2.6
Respons Analyse	26 Mar–1 Apr 2020	1,000	–	3.5	7.3	4.2	26.7	13.5	2.8	3.2	25.2	12.4	1.2	1.5
Kantar TNS	25–31 Mar 2020	980	74.1	3.8	7.0	4.6	24.8	14.8	2.3	4.1	24.6	12.3	1.6	0.2
Norstat	23–29 Mar 2020	953	75.7	3.7	7.2	3.7	25.7	15.3	3.6	2.8	24.9	12.0	1.1	0.8
Norstat	16–23 Mar 2020	952	–	4.1	7.6	3.8	26.7	14.6	2.2	3.2	23.3	12.7	2.1	3.4
Ipsos MMI	18–20 Mar 2020	1,000	64.9	4.7	9.0	4.4	24.9	17.4	2.6	3.7	20.8	11.4	1.1	4.1
Sentio	10–16 Mar 2020	1,000	–	2.7	7.1	7.3	24.3	17.5	3.4	3.4	18.8	13.0	2.6	5.5
Opinion Perduco	3–9 Mar 2020	970	–	3.9	6.9	6.7	24.0	18.3	3.5	3.1	18.8	13.5	1.2	5.2
Norfakta	3–4 Mar 2020	1,000	78.0	5.1	7.0	7.0	25.8	15.9	2.5	2.9	20.6	12.0	1.1	5.2
Respons Analyse	27 Feb–2 Mar 2020	1,000	–	5.4	7.2	5.1	24.9	16.7	3.3	3.5	17.9	14.6	1.4	7.0
Norstat	24 Feb–2 Mar 2020	949	72.7	4.6	8.4	4.9	23.7	16.4	2.7	4.1	19.9	13.2	2.1	3.8
Kantar TNS	24–28 Feb 2020	961	78.4	4.1	8.5	5.6	21.5	17.6	3.7	3.0	19.8	13.7	2.6	1.7
Norstat	17–23 Feb 2020	–	–	4.7	6.5	6.3	24.0	15.7	4.4	3.5	18.9	14.3	1.7	5.1
Ipsos MMI	17–19 Feb 2020	1,000	72.6	3.5	7.1	5.4	25.8	14.8	3.5	3.6	18.8	14.2	3.3	7.0
Sentio	11–17 Feb 2020	–	–	3.9	7.2	6.8	23.6	14.1	3.8	3.9	19.7	14.6	2.3	3.9
Opinion Perduco	4–10 Feb 2020	969	–	5.3	6.5	4.6	25.1	15.2	4.2	3.5	19.4	15.1	1.2	5.7
Norfakta	4–5 Feb 2020	1,000	–	4.2	7.6	5.2	22.2	15.9	4.4	4.5	19.4	14.9	1.5	2.8
Respons Analyse	30 Jan–3 Feb 2020	1,002	–	4.6	6.7	5.5	24.9	13.9	2.7	4.2	19.9	15.3	2.3	5.0
Norstat	27 Jan–2 Feb 2020	952	–	5.0	6.1	4.3	23.2	17.3	3.3	4.4	18.3	16.0	2.0	4.9
Kantar TNS	27–31 Jan 2020	990	80.3	4.3	7.7	5.9	24.2	15.0	4.0	4.3	17.8	15.7	1.1	6.4
Sentio	24–27 Jan 2020	1,007	–	6.9	7.7	4.9	25.6	12.5	2.0	3.9	16.2	17.5	2.6	8.1
Norstat	21–27 Jan 2020	–	–	3.7	7.6	4.9	26.8	12.8	3.0	4.0	21.0	14.7	1.5	5.8
Ipsos MMI	20–22 Jan 2020	1,000	75.2	4.1	5.9	3.5	25.9	16.4	3.7	2.8	19.7	15.7	2.3	6.2
Kantar TNS	21 Jan 2020	800	80.0	5.1	6.5	3.5	25.3	14.5	2.2	5.2	20.4	14.6	2.6	4.9
Respons Analyse	20–21 Jan 2020	1,182	–	3.8	7.0	5.2	25.2	14.8	3.1	3.2	20.9	14.2	2.6	4.3
Sentio	14–18 Jan 2020	1,000	–	4.5	7.9	5.4	25.4	16.8	4.1	3.0	20.6	10.8	1.4	4.8
Opinion Perduco	15 Jan 2020	962	–	4.4	7.4	4.3	25.5	20.9	2.7	2.5	18.7	11.8	2.0	4.6
Kantar TNS	6–10 Jan 2020	986	80.8	4.7	8.8	6.5	23.5	17.9	2.2	3.2	22.4	8.7	2.2	1.1
Norfakta	7–8 Jan 2020	1,000	78.0	4.8	6.2	5.3	26.7	16.6	2.4	3.2	21.3	10.9	2.6	5.4
Respons Analyse	2–6 Jan 2020	1,001	–	5.1	6.6	6.1	24.0	15.8	2.5	4.2	22.4	11.4	1.9	1.6
2017 election	11 Sep 2017	—	78.3	2.4	6.0	3.2	27.4	10.3	4.4	4.2	25.0	15.2	1.7	2.4

=== 2019 ===
Polling firm	Fieldwork date	Sample size	Resp.	R	SV	MDG	Ap	Sp	V	KrF	H	FrP	Others	Lead
Norstat	30 Dec 2019–5 Jan 2020	960	–	3.6	7.2	6.0	26.1	15.7	2.3	3.6	22.4	10.3	2.8	3.7
Ipsos MMI	16–18 Dec 2019	–	–	5.9	8.5	5.0	23.4	15.8	2.8	3.0	22.1	11.3	2.2	1.3
Norstat	9–15 Dec 2019	1,000	–	4.6	7.1	4.6	25.5	18.5	2.9	2.6	20.9	11.8	1.6	4.6
Opinion Perduco	3–8 Dec 2019	966	–	5.7	7.5	5.9	22.9	20.2	1.9	2.6	20.6	10.7	2.0	2.3
Norfakta	3–4 Dec 2019	1,000	81.0	3.9	7.7	5.0	21.3	19.2	3.9	4.0	22.6	10.1	2.3	1.3
Respons Analyse	28 Nov–2 Dec 2019	1,000	–	5.3	6.2	5.9	23.0	17.4	3.5	3.9	22.0	10.3	2.5	1.0
Sentio	26 Nov–2 Dec 2019	1,000	–	5.6	8.3	6.9	24.2	15.6	2.4	3.5	20.8	11.1	1.8	3.4
Kantar TNS	25–29 Nov 2019	974	81.5	5.0	7.9	6.1	21.9	17.6	4.4	4.1	19.1	9.8	4.2	2.8
Norstat	19–25 Nov 2019	966	77.5	4.5	6.5	6.4	22.9	18.1	3.5	2.8	19.7	12.5	3.2	3.2
Ipsos MMI	18–20 Nov 2019	–	–	5.0	8.3	5.3	22.0	19.2	2.6	3.5	20.9	9.7	3.5	1.1
Norstat	12–18 Nov 2019	–	–	4.2	8.1	6.9	22.9	20.0	2.0	2.9	20.8	9.0	3.1	2.1
Opinion Perduco	5–11 Nov 2019	964	–	4.4	8.4	6.5	21.7	20.9	3.0	3.8	20.6	8.9	1.8	0.8
Norfakta	5–6 Nov 2019	1,000	79.0	4.2	7.1	6.1	22.3	19.2	4.3	3.4	22.9	8.4	2.1	0.6
Respons Analyse	31 Oct–4 Nov 2019	1,003	–	6.0	6.5	5.9	23.0	16.5	3.2	3.9	21.3	11.4	2.3	1.7
Sentio	29 Oct–2 Nov 2019	1,000	–	3.9	7.7	6.3	22.6	20.0	3.9	3.1	20.8	9.2	2.6	1.8
Kantar TNS	28 Oct–1 Nov 2019	982	81.9	6.6	5.6	6.9	22.6	19.5	3.4	2.9	21.1	9.2	2.2	1.5
Norstat	22–28 Oct 2019	957	73.5	6.0	7.4	6.1	23.7	17.5	3.3	3.9	21.8	8.4	2.0	1.9
Ipsos MMI	21–23 Oct 2019	764	–	6.1	6.4	7.0	22.6	17.6	3.6	2.7	21.1	10.3	2.5	1.5
Norstat	15–21 Oct 2019	929	–	4.9	7.7	6.2	21.6	18.1	3.3	3.6	20.1	11.7	2.8	1.5
Sentio	8–14 Oct 2019	1,000	–	3.2	6.4	7.7	24.9	17.6	4.1	3.6	20.9	9.0	2.7	4.0
Opinion Perduco	1–7 Oct 2019	951	–	4.6	8.2	5.5	22.2	18.7	3.7	3.4	22.8	9.0	1.9	0.6
Norfakta	1–2 Oct 2019	1,000	81.0	4.0	7.0	6.0	23.5	17.2	3.8	3.3	21.4	10.5	3.3	2.1
Kantar TNS	30 Sep–4 Oct 2019	980	84.6	6.1	8.9	7.2	23.3	15.6	2.6	3.9	20.2	9.0	3.2	3.1
Norstat	24–30 Sep 2019	–	–	3.6	6.6	7.8	24.1	18.6	3.4	3.7	19.7	8.6	4.0	4.4
Respons Analyse	23–25 Sep 2019	1,000	–	3.3	6.7	6.9	26.3	14.8	3.0	4.2	20.6	11.9	2.3	5.7
Ipsos MMI	23–25 Sep 2019	939	–	4.1	8.4	6.4	22.0	17.3	2.6	3.4	21.3	11.7	2.8	0.7
Norstat	17–19 Sep 2019	712	–	4.4	9.1	8.6	20.8	15.8	2.9	3.7	21.1	11.2	2.4	0.3
Sentio	10–16 Sep 2019	1,000	–	4.0	6.9	6.1	22.6	16.8	3.0	3.4	21.1	12.4	3.6	1.5
2019 local elections	9 Sep 2019	–	–	3.8	6.1	6.8	24.8	14.4	3.9	4.0	20.1	8.2	7.9	4.7
Norfakta	3–4 Sep 2019	1,003	–	3.3	7.4	6.5	23.8	17.1	2.4	3.3	22.1	11.0	3.1	1.7
Norstat	27 Aug–2 Sep 2019	751	79.0	4.5	6.1	5.4	24.8	16.1	3.4	3.9	21.2	11.6	4.1	3.6
Norstat	20–26 Aug 2019	943	–	5.0	6.3	5.7	22.2	16.0	3.1	4.4	22.8	11.7	2.8	0.6
Ipsos MMI	19–21 Aug 2019	719	–	4.4	7.9	6.7	23.4	16.1	3.0	2.7	20.9	11.1	3.8	2.5
Sentio	13–18 Aug 2019	1,000	–	4.8	6.5	5.4	27.3	14.4	3.7	3.5	20.9	8.9	4.5	6.4
Respons Analyse	9–14 Aug 2019	1,000	75.0	4.7	6.3	7.0	24.0	15.4	2.5	4.5	21.9	10.6	3.1	2.1
Norstat	6–12 Aug 2019	953	76.4	6.4	5.9	5.3	24.6	14.2	2.7	3.2	22.8	10.9	4.1	1.8
Kantar TNS	5–9 Aug 2019	973	76.5	5.2	8.4	6.4	23.5	15.3	2.0	3.8	22.8	9.1	3.5	0.7
Norfakta	6–7 Aug 2019	1,000	82.0	5.0	7.5	3.7	24.4	15.9	2.8	3.9	24.2	9.0	3.7	0.2
Opinion Perduco	30 Jul–5 Aug 2019	960	69.0	5.2	8.8	7.0	22.2	14.6	3.1	3.2	22.1	10.1	3.8	0.1
Norfakta	2–3 Jul 2019	1,001	75.0	4.2	7.6	5.5	24.4	15.1	2.9	4.3	21.2	8.8	6.0	3.2
Kantar TNS	24–28 Jun 2019	978	79.8	5.7	7.8	4.9	25.5	13.3	5.0	3.4	22.0	7.5	4.9	3.5
Ipsos MMI	24–26 Jun 2019	723	–	5.1	6.9	3.9	27.8	14.4	2.3	2.3	20.5	10.7	6.0	7.3
Norstat	18–24 Jun 2019	950	–	5.4	7.0	5.7	26.0	14.3	2.5	4.2	23.0	9.0	2.9	3.0
Sentio	11–17 Jun 2019	1,000	–	4.5	6.8	5.8	25.2	15.2	2.5	2.7	22.7	10.5	4.1	2.5
Opinion Perduco	4–10 Jun 2019	956	74.0	7.1	6.4	6.5	23.0	16.9	2.8	2.6	19.1	11.4	4.2	3.9
Respons Analyse	3–6 Jun 2019	1,002	78.0	5.2	6.8	4.9	26.0	13.3	3.5	3.6	23.1	10.7	2.9	2.9
Norfakta	4–5 Jun 2019	1,000	–	5.9	6.0	5.7	25.2	15.8	1.5	3.2	24.3	10.2	2.4	0.9
Norstat	28 May–3 Jun 2019	951	–	5.0	6.8	6.3	24.4	14.9	2.7	3.5	21.0	11.4	4.0	3.4
Ipsos MMI	27–29 May 2019	739	–	5.1	6.3	4.6	26.9	15.2	2.0	2.3	20.7	12.1	4.8	6.2
Norstat	21–27 May 2019	940	–	4.8	6.5	4.3	23.7	13.3	3.4	3.7	22.9	12.5	5.0	0.8
Sentio	14–18 May 2019	1,000	–	6.6	6.1	5.1	23.1	15.8	2.3	3.6	22.6	11.9	2.9	0.5
Opinion Perduco	7–13 May 2019	951	–	5.1	8.3	4.0	27.2	14.1	2.1	2.7	21.2	13.1	2.4	6.0
Norfakta	7–8 May 2019	1,003	–	4.9	7.4	3.0	25.1	14.4	3.0	3.2	24.4	11.9	2.7	0.7
Norstat	30 Apr–6 May 2019	1,000	–	5.0	6.2	3.9	26.5	15.0	3.7	3.5	20.2	12.6	3.3	6.3
Kantar TNS	29 Apr–3 May 2019	987	79.3	5.4	7.2	3.9	26.0	14.7	4.1	3.9	21.0	11.6	2.3	5.0
Norstat	2 May 2019	–	–	5.1	7.5	4.8	27.6	15.7	2.3	3.3	20.4	11.2	2.3	7.2
Respons Analyse	29 Apr–2 May 2019	1,000	–	3.9	8.4	4.4	28.2	12.5	1.9	4.1	21.6	13.0	2.0	6.6
Ipsos MMI	23–25 Apr 2019	942	–	4.5	6.8	3.0	28.1	14.4	2.2	3.9	23.8	10.1	3.2	4.3
Sentio	16 Apr 2019	–	–	4.6	7.0	4.1	27.5	15.4	2.4	3.4	23.2	10.0	2.4	4.3
Opinion Perduco	2–8 Apr 2019	954	–	4.5	8.2	3.7	27.5	16.7	2.3	2.6	21.5	10.6	2.5	6.0
Respons Analyse	2–4 Apr 2019	1,001	–	4.7	7.6	3.9	25.6	15.6	4.3	3.0	22.4	10.1	2.8	3.2
Norfakta	2–3 Apr 2019	1,032	–	4.3	8.4	3.0	26.1	15.2	3.0	3.8	22.5	11.2	2.5	3.6
Norstat	26 Mar–1 Apr 2019	628	–	3.7	7.0	4.7	24.0	16.9	2.9	4.2	22.3	11.9	2.4	1.7
Kantar TNS	25–29 Mar 2019	982	80.6	5.1	7.5	5.0	24.3	16.9	3.4	3.7	21.6	10.4	2.2	2.7
Norstat	27 Mar 2019	–	–	4.9	6.8	4.3	26.6	14.3	1.8	2.4	24.6	12.1	2.2	2.0
Ipsos MMI	18–20 Mar 2019	942	–	5.6	7.0	3.6	28.8	14.4	2.0	2.5	21.3	11.7	3.1	7.5
Sentio	12–18 Mar 2019	1,000	–	5.4	7.3	3.2	27.7	14.5	2.3	3.0	24.7	10.6	1.4	3.0
Opinion Perduco	5–11 Mar 2019	957	–	4.9	7.1	6.0	25.1	12.7	2.0	4.8	26.1	10.6	0.8	1.0
Norfakta	5–6 Mar 2019	1,002	74.0	4.5	8.1	3.7	27.0	14.0	2.3	3.3	24.6	10.7	1.8	2.4
Respons Analyse	28 Feb–4 Mar 2019	1,000	–	5.0	7.6	3.3	24.3	14.6	2.8	3.8	24.3	12.6	1.7	Tie
Norstat	26 Feb–4 Mar 2019	653	–	4.8	8.0	4.4	26.5	12.4	1.9	4.0	24.3	12.1	1.5	2.2
Kantar TNS	25 Feb–1 Mar 2019	972	73.7	4.8	8.0	3.6	27.4	12.8	2.2	3.7	24.8	10.2	2.7	2.6
Norstat	19–25 Feb 2019	–	–	6.2	6.6	3.0	26.9	16.0	1.8	3.2	22.3	12.5	1.5	4.6
Ipsos MMI	18–20 Feb 2019	932	–	6.6	7.0	3.8	26.9	13.0	2.3	2.5	25.1	10.0	2.8	1.8
Sentio	12–19 Feb 2019	1,000	–	5.1	8.0	3.9	27.4	15.6	2.3	3.4	21.1	10.8	2.4	6.3
Opinion Perduco	5–11 Feb 2019	942	73.0	7.6	8.0	2.3	28.2	13.9	2.3	3.2	22.1	11.8	0.6	6.1
Norfakta	5–6 Feb 2019	1,005	78.0	4.0	7.2	3.3	29.3	12.7	3.3	4.1	22.9	10.9	2.3	6.4
Respons Analyse	31 Jan–4 Feb 2019	1,001	72.0	3.6	7.8	3.8	29.7	12.2	3.9	3.8	22.9	10.5	1.8	6.8
Norstat	29 Jan–4 Feb 2019	937	70.0	4.8	7.8	3.2	29.2	11.8	2.6	3.4	22.9	12.0	2.2	6.3
Kantar TNS	28 Jan–2 Feb 2019	986	82.7	6.2	8.8	3.6	26.5	10.4	2.5	4.1	23.6	11.7	2.5	2.9
Norstat	22–28 Jan 2019	691	–	4.4	7.3	3.7	29.1	11.2	2.7	3.5	22.5	13.5	2.1	6.6
Ipsos MMI	21–23 Jan 2019	935	–	4.2	8.0	3.2	29.8	10.9	2.2	2.7	22.8	13.0	3.2	7.0
Sentio	15–21 Jan 2019	1,000	65.2	3.1	6.9	3.8	26.3	13.4	4.3	3.5	23.6	13.2	1.8	2.7
Opinion Perduco	8–14 Jan 2019	957	72.0	5.5	7.9	3.2	28.5	12.6	2.4	3.7	22.9	10.8	2.5	5.6
Kantar TNS	3–10 Jan 2019	980	77.4	4.6	7.2	2.8	27.9	12.2	3.6	3.0	24.2	12.0	2.0	3.7
Norfakta	8–9 Jan 2019	1,000	–	3.9	7.4	2.8	27.7	12.5	3.3	3.8	24.7	12.0	1.9	3.0
Respons Analyse	3–7 Jan 2019	1,001	–	3.1	6.7	2.8	29.7	10.5	4.4	3.8	26.0	11.5	1.5	3.7
Norstat	2–7 Jan 2019	925	76.5	3.3	7.4	2.4	27.3	12.1	3.1	3.7	27.0	12.2	1.6	0.3
2017 election	11 Sep 2017	—	78.3	2.4	6.0	3.2	27.4	10.3	4.4	4.2	25.0	15.2	1.7	2.4

=== 2018 ===
Polling firm	Fieldwork date	Sample size	Resp.	R	SV	MDG	Ap	Sp	V	KrF	H	FrP	Others	Lead
Ipsos MMI	17–19 Dec 2018	944	–	2.7	8.1	3.7	28.5	10.4	3.0	3.8	24.7	12.8	2.3	3.8
Norstat	11–17 Dec 2018	927	–	4.1	6.9	3.4	26.8	11.2	3.4	3.5	26.5	12.4	1.8	0.3
Opinion Perduco	4–10 Dec 2018	946	73.0	5.1	5.8	3.6	27.1	11.9	4.4	3.4	22.9	14.6	1.1	4.2
Norfakta	4–5 Dec 2018	1,000	76.0	3.1	7.4	2.5	28.4	11.6	3.0	3.8	25.9	12.0	2.3	2.5
Respons Analyse	29 Nov–4 Dec 2018	1,000	–	3.9	8.8	2.4	26.0	10.5	3.4	4.1	25.7	13.5	1.7	0.3
Sentio	28 Nov–4 Dec 2018	1,000	70.8	4.8	5.5	2.4	30.0	12.2	4.3	3.5	24.3	12.0	1.1	5.7
Kantar TNS	3 Dec 2018	968	74.6	4.8	6.3	2.8	27.4	11.9	3.6	3.0	24.7	13.9	0.8	2.7
Norstat	20–25 Nov 2018	933	–	3.3	7.0	2.8	29.7	11.4	2.8	3.2	24.7	13.1	2.0	5.0
Ipsos MMI	19–21 Nov 2018	917	–	3.6	6.1	2.5	31.2	11.7	3.6	3.3	23.1	12.8	2.1	8.1
Norstat	13–19 Nov 2018	937	–	3.3	6.6	2.9	29.0	12.0	3.2	4.3	24.6	13.2	1.7	4.4
Opinion Perduco	6–12 Nov 2018	950	74.0	4.9	6.0	3.3	28.3	11.9	3.7	3.8	26.2	10.8	1.1	2.1
Respons Analyse	5–7 Nov 2018	1,000	–	3.9	6.0	2.9	28.4	10.3	4.1	4.2	26.5	12.8	0.9	1.9
Norfakta	5 Nov 2018	1,005	80.0	3.9	5.0	2.2	29.1	11.7	3.8	4.0	26.1	13.2	0.9	3.0
Sentio	30 Oct–5 Nov 2018	1,000	68.9	4.4	7.5	2.4	25.0	10.0	4.5	4.7	26.9	13.7	1.0	1.9
Kantar TNS	24–30 Oct 2018	990	79.2	4.8	7.2	2.8	27.6	9.0	2.3	3.0	26.8	13.8	2.6	0.8
Norstat	23–28 Oct 2018	693	–	3.5	6.7	3.2	27.2	12.1	3.7	3.9	24.3	14.1	1.3	2.9
Ipsos MMI	22–24 Oct 2018	947	–	4.0	7.7	2.2	26.0	12.4	5.1	4.4	26.3	10.4	1.5	0.3
Norstat	16–22 Oct 2018	941	–	3.9	7.2	2.0	28.7	10.3	3.7	3.6	25.4	13.6	1.7	3.3
Sentio	9–18 Oct 2018	1,000	70.3	3.6	6.6	2.4	28.8	10.5	2.8	4.5	25.7	12.7	2.5	3.1
InFact	9–10 Oct 2018	1,009	–	4.1	5.7	2.7	24.4	11.2	3.8	4.8	26.1	14.7	2.5	1.7
Opinion Perduco	4–10 Oct 2018	944	72.0	5.1	5.9	3.2	26.6	12.7	2.6	5.0	25.0	13.0	0.9	1.6
Norfakta	2–3 Oct 2018	1,001	–	4.0	6.6	2.2	28.2	11.2	2.4	4.1	26.0	13.3	2.1	2.2
Respons Analyse	1–3 Oct 2018	1,000	–	3.0	6.7	2.7	27.7	9.8	3.9	4.7	25.5	14.4	1.6	2.2
Norstat	24–29 Sep 2018	924	–	3.3	7.1	4.2	26.9	11.2	3.5	3.7	24.7	14.0	1.4	2.2
Kantar TNS	24–28 Sep 2018	973	80.9	4.0	7.6	2.4	26.7	10.4	4.1	3.8	26.7	12.7	1.4	Tie
Ipsos MMI	24–26 Sep 2018	932	–	4.6	6.1	2.3	28.7	10.1	2.3	3.0	25.7	14.9	2.3	3.0
Norstat	18–24 Sep 2018	932	–	5.0	6.2	2.3	26.6	12.0	3.4	3.0	24.3	15.7	1.4	2.3
Sentio	11–17 Sep 2018	1,000	70.7	4.8	6.3	3.8	28.0	9.1	3.0	3.9	27.4	11.8	1.8	0.6
Respons Analyse	6–10 Sep 2018	1,002	–	4.7	6.3	3.5	25.5	10.4	3.8	3.9	26.0	14.1	1.8	0.5
Opinion Perduco	4–10 Sep 2018	944	72.0	3.5	7.1	3.0	27.7	10.6	3.4	2.9	26.4	13.1	2.3	1.3
Kantar TNS	6 Sep 2018	979	73.5	5.5	6.5	2.4	24.9	11.6	3.5	3.7	29.0	10.4	2.6	4.1
Norfakta	4–5 Sep 2018	1,000	78.0	4.6	7.0	2.1	24.6	11.1	4.2	4.0	24.1	17.6	0.7	0.5
Norstat	28 Aug–2 Sep 2018	721	–	4.4	6.0	2.8	26.2	11.2	3.3	3.5	26.6	13.9	2.3	0.4
Norstat	20–26 Aug 2018	928	–	4.2	6.9	3.6	24.4	12.5	3.0	3.6	27.4	12.9	1.4	3.0
Ipsos MMI	20–25 Aug 2018	943	–	3.7	6.0	3.2	28.5	11.5	3.9	3.3	24.8	13.0	2.1	3.7
Respons Analyse	16–20 Aug 2018	1,001	–	4.1	7.7	2.2	25.9	10.3	5.2	3.9	25.6	14.6	0.5	0.3
Sentio	14–20 Aug 2018	1,000	67.8	4.4	6.4	3.4	25.9	10.7	3.6	4.2	26.6	13.3	1.4	0.7
Norstat	7–12 Aug 2018	932	70.9	5.3	6.1	3.4	23.8	11.8	3.5	4.0	27.5	12.7	1.8	3.7
Norfakta	7–8 Aug 2018	1,003	–	3.7	5.8	2.4	27.8	12.3	5.1	4.8	24.6	12.9	0.7	3.2
Kantar TNS	1–7 Aug 2018	982	75.4	5.3	8.0	2.5	24.4	13.6	3.6	5.3	26.1	10.1	1.1	1.7
Opinion Perduco	31 Jul–6 Aug 2018	953	72.0	5.8	6.6	4.1	28.2	11.2	2.4	4.2	23.6	12.6	1.2	4.6
Norfakta	3–4 Jul 2018	1,001	76.0	3.9	7.5	3.7	23.7	9.7	3.4	5.0	26.3	14.8	2.0	2.6
Ipsos MMI	25–27 Jun 2018	941	–	3.8	7.1	2.4	22.2	11.4	3.9	4.7	27.9	13.5	3.1	5.7
Norstat	19–25 Jun 2018	941	–	4.9	7.5	2.5	21.5	10.7	5.1	4.2	27.8	13.6	2.2	6.3
Sentio	12–16 Jun 2018	1,000	70.4	5.3	7.3	2.1	25.2	10.2	3.2	4.1	27.1	14.0	1.8	1.9
Opinion Perduco	5–11 Jun 2018	954	73.0	4.8	6.5	4.2	24.0	10.7	4.1	3.8	27.1	13.0	1.8	3.1
Norfakta	5–6 Jun 2018	1,002	79.0	4.4	6.0	3.4	24.1	11.3	4.5	3.0	29.4	12.5	1.4	5.3
Respons Analyse	31 May–4 Jun 2018	1,000	–	4.8	7.6	2.9	22.0	11.0	3.7	4.1	26.4	15.1	2.4	4.4
Norstat	27 May–4 Jun 2018	930	–	4.5	7.5	3.4	23.4	11.0	4.1	3.8	27.6	13.1	1.7	4.2
Kantar TNS	28 May–1 Jun 2018	977	76.2	5.6	8.5	3.2	23.4	11.3	4.5	5.3	24.5	12.4	1.3	1.1
Ipsos MMI	28–30 May 2018	939	–	3.2	7.7	3.0	22.9	11.1	5.9	3.8	27.0	13.5	1.9	4.1
Norstat	22–28 May 2018	929	–	4.0	7.2	2.7	23.6	11.8	4.1	4.2	26.4	13.9	2.3	2.8
Sentio	14–22 May 2018	1,000	72.3	3.4	8.0	2.9	23.5	10.6	3.2	3.8	28.4	14.0	2.3	4.9
Opinion Perduco	8–14 May 2018	945	73.0	4.4	7.1	3.3	22.8	10.5	3.8	5.5	26.5	15.0	1.2	3.7
Norfakta	8–9 May 2018	1,000	81.0	3.2	6.9	3.0	24.7	10.5	3.9	3.9	26.7	15.4	1.8	2.0
Respons Analyse	3–7 May 2018	1,002	–	3.5	7.3	3.2	25.5	9.5	3.5	3.7	26.2	16.1	1.5	0.7
Norstat	30 Apr–7 May 2018	703	–	3.5	6.5	3.2	26.0	11.0	3.8	3.0	25.5	15.9	1.6	0.5
Kantar TNS	30 Apr–2 May 2018	982	78.9	3.8	7.6	2.3	23.8	10.3	4.1	4.7	28.1	14.7	0.7	4.3
Norstat	26–30 Apr 2018	933	–	4.0	6.8	2.9	24.0	10.9	3.7	3.7	26.4	15.3	2.4	2.4
Ipsos MMI	23–25 Apr 2018	941	–	4.7	6.0	3.0	23.2	11.9	4.0	4.4	24.9	16.0	1.8	1.7
Sentio	17–23 Apr 2018	1,000	68.3	2.8	7.3	3.0	23.8	11.9	3.6	4.9	25.2	15.7	1.7	1.4
Opinion Perduco	10–16 Apr 2018	945	75.0	4.9	7.7	1.9	24.0	11.5	4.1	4.0	27.0	13.5	1.4	3.0
Respons Analyse	5–9 Apr 2018	1,001	–	3.9	6.2	3.1	23.4	10.9	4.1	4.5	25.8	16.2	1.8	2.4
Norstat	3–9 Apr 2018	925	–	3.8	7.5	2.5	25.2	10.7	3.7	3.7	25.1	15.8	1.9	0.1
Kantar TNS	3–6 Apr 2018	971	79.5	5.4	8.7	2.9	24.1	9.0	2.8	3.7	26.4	16.2	1.0	2.3
Norfakta	3–4 Apr 2018	1,000	–	4.3	7.4	3.0	23.2	10.6	3.6	4.1	26.5	17.4	0.1	3.3
Norstat	20–24 Mar 2018	955	–	4.0	6.6	2.3	24.3	11.0	4.3	4.8	25.3	15.4	1.9	1.0
Ipsos MMI	19–21 Mar 2018	935	–	3.3	6.6	2.4	23.7	10.2	3.2	3.8	23.9	20.8	2.2	0.2
Kantar TNS	20 Mar 2018	600	83.0	1.7	5.6	2.1	23.6	10.3	5.0	4.4	26.0	20.6	0.9	2.4
Sentio	13–19 Mar 2018	1,000	71.0	4.0	7.1	2.6	23.3	11.9	3.5	4.1	26.6	15.8	1.1	3.3
Respons Analyse	15–16 Mar 2018	1,002	–	2.5	6.4	3.1	25.1	10.8	4.4	3.2	26.9	15.9	1.7	1.8
Opinion Perduco	6–12 Mar 2018	951	72.0	4.5	6.9	3.2	23.3	11.0	4.6	3.6	27.3	14.5	1.1	4.0
Norfakta	6–7 Mar 2018	1,001	79.0	3.3	6.9	3.9	22.5	12.8	3.8	3.9	28.4	12.7	1.8	5.9
Respons Analyse	1–5 Mar 2018	1,003	–	3.1	7.2	3.1	23.4	11.6	4.7	4.4	28.0	13.1	1.4	4.6
Norstat	27 Feb–5 Mar 2018	930	–	3.2	7.0	2.8	23.3	12.3	4.3	3.2	27.4	15.0	1.5	4.1
Kantar TNS	26 Feb–3 Mar 2018	980	82.9	3.8	6.6	3.6	23.4	12.1	4.9	4.5	29.3	10.9	1.0	5.9
Norstat	20–25 Feb 2018	933	–	3.1	6.0	3.3	24.5	10.8	3.5	4.5	28.8	12.9	2.5	4.3
Ipsos MMI	19–21 Feb 2018	950	–	3.3	7.5	3.0	25.4	9.7	4.4	3.5	27.3	13.6	2.3	1.9
Sentio	13–19 Feb 2018	1,000	74.3	3.2	6.1	3.2	23.3	10.4	4.1	5.1	28.7	15.0	0.9	5.4
Opinion Perduco	6–12 Feb 2018	944	74.0	4.0	7.3	4.0	21.4	10.0	3.9	3.6	29.2	15.9	0.8	7.8
Respons Analyse	5–7 Feb 2018	1,002	–	3.3	7.2	3.6	24.0	10.9	4.5	3.6	27.9	13.6	1.4	3.9
Norstat	30 Jan–5 Feb 2018	943	–	2.9	8.6	3.7	22.4	11.2	3.8	3.9	28.9	13.1	1.5	6.5
Kantar TNS	29 Jan–5 Feb 2018	985	80.7	3.6	6.3	3.4	23.6	11.2	5.8	3.8	29.1	12.0	1.1	5.5
Norfakta	30–31 Jan 2018	1,003	77.0	2.6	7.7	3.5	23.9	11.0	4.2	4.3	27.9	13.4	1.5	4.0
Norstat	23–28 Jan 2018	936	–	2.8	7.4	2.7	22.7	11.0	4.0	4.3	29.9	12.8	2.3	7.2
Ipsos MMI	22–24 Jan 2018	893	–	3.0	7.6	3.0	25.4	12.1	4.6	3.7	26.2	12.5	1.9	0.8
Sentio	16–21 Jan 2018	1,000	70.2	3.1	7.6	3.2	22.7	10.1	3.0	4.5	30.5	13.4	2.0	7.8
Opinion Perduco	9–15 Jan 2018	968	72.0	3.0	7.3	3.0	20.8	10.8	4.5	4.6	30.1	14.5	1.0	9.3
Respons Analyse	10–12 Jan 2018	1,000	–	2.9	7.5	2.8	23.2	11.3	4.1	4.4	29.4	13.2	1.2	6.2
Respons Analyse	8–10 Jan 2018	1,000	81.0	2.7	7.7	2.7	23.1	10.7	4.1	4.1	27.1	15.5	2.3	4.0
Kantar TNS	3–9 Jan 2018	968	80.6	3.0	8.6	2.6	19.4	10.9	4.3	4.5	30.5	14.8	1.5	11.1
Norstat	2–8 Jan 2018	977	–	2.9	8.3	2.7	20.1	12.2	3.6	4.6	28.7	14.9	2.0	8.6
Norfakta	2–3 Jan 2018	1,000	–	3.1	5.7	3.8	24.2	10.3	4.7	3.3	29.1	14.5	1.4	4.9
2017 election	11 Sep 2017	—	78.3	2.4	6.0	3.2	27.4	10.3	4.4	4.2	25.0	15.2	1.7	2.4

=== 2017 ===
Polling firm	Fieldwork date	Sample size	Resp.	R	SV	MDG	Ap	Sp	V	KrF	H	FrP	Others	Lead
Ipsos MMI	18–20 Dec 2017	929	–	1.9	8.0	2.6	26.3	10.1	4.8	4.3	26.5	13.7	1.9	0.2
Norstat	12–18 Dec 2017	949	–	2.9	8.4	3.6	26.0	10.6	3.4	3.6	26.5	13.9	1.2	0.5
Sentio	5–11 Dec 2017	1,000	76.8	2.6	6.0	3.7	25.9	10.6	3.5	4.6	26.5	14.9	1.7	0.6
Kantar TNS	4–8 Dec 2017	974	79.6	2.8	6.9	3.5	26.0	9.7	4.3	4.1	26.6	14.8	1.3	0.6
Norfakta	5–6 Dec 2017	1,000	83.0	2.1	7.0	3.3	26.7	10.2	4.7	3.7	27.5	13.6	1.2	0.8
Opinion Perduco	28 Nov–4 Dec 2017	960	76.0	2.5	6.0	4.4	26.6	11.5	3.4	3.9	25.8	14.9	0.9	0.8
Norstat	21–27 Nov 2017	939	–	1.7	7.1	2.9	25.8	11.2	3.9	4.6	26.8	14.7	1.2	1.0
Ipsos MMI	20–22 Nov 2017	918	–	2.8	5.4	3.9	27.9	8.6	4.8	3.8	25.0	15.9	1.9	2.9
Norstat	14–20 Nov 2017	955	–	2.9	7.0	2.9	27.1	9.3	3.8	4.0	26.1	16.1	0.8	1.0
Sentio	7–13 Nov 2017	1,000	79.2	3.0	6.7	2.8	25.6	10.9	3.9	4.0	28.2	13.2	1.7	2.6
Kantar TNS	6–10 Nov 2017	972	85.4	3.9	7.4	1.9	25.3	11.5	5.9	3.1	26.9	12.7	1.4	1.6
Norfakta	7–8 Nov 2017	1,003	85.0	3.3	7.3	1.9	26.6	10.5	3.7	3.2	27.0	14.6	1.9	0.4
Opinion Perduco	31 Oct–6 Nov 2017	956	79.0	2.8	7.3	3.8	25.1	11.2	4.3	4.0	25.7	14.9	0.9	0.6
Norstat	25–31 Oct 2017	937	–	2.4	7.5	2.7	26.0	11.7	3.7	4.2	25.9	14.5	1.5	0.1
Ipsos MMI	23–25 Oct 2017	947	–	3.4	5.9	2.9	27.4	10.9	3.8	3.7	25.8	13.5	2.7	1.6
Norstat	17–23 Oct 2017	942	–	3.2	6.5	3.2	26.5	10.7	4.9	4.1	25.6	13.7	1.6	0.9
Sentio	10–16 Oct 2017	1,000	79.9	3.1	7.3	4.9	25.2	10.2	4.6	3.2	25.2	14.6	1.8	Tie
Opinion Perduco	3–9 Oct 2017	958	80.0	2.2	6.0	4.8	25.8	10.6	4.1	4.1	26.7	14.9	0.8	0.9
Kantar TNS	2–6 Oct 2017	975	–	3.7	6.4	3.4	25.4	9.3	4.8	3.2	29.2	13.1	1.6	3.8
Norfakta	3–4 Oct 2017	1,000	85.0	1.8	6.5	3.6	25.8	11.4	3.4	4.4	27.6	13.4	2.1	1.8
Norstat	27 Sep–1 Oct 2017	941	–	2.5	7.5	3.0	26.4	10.6	4.2	3.9	25.6	14.3	1.9	0.8
Ipsos MMI	25–27 Sep 2017	935	–	2.7	7.4	3.3	26.1	10.2	5.4	3.9	24.4	14.4	2.3	1.7
Norstat	19–25 Sep 2017	936	–	3.7	7.3	2.8	24.9	11.3	4.7	3.2	25.1	15.0	1.9	0.2
Sentio	12–18 Sep 2017	1,000	80.1	2.4	6.4	3.3	26.2	11.4	3.9	3.9	26.8	14.7	0.9	0.6
2017 election	11 Sep 2017	—	78.3	2.4	6.0	3.2	27.4	10.3	4.4	4.2	25.0	15.2	1.7	2.4

== By electoral district ==
=== Akershus ===
Polling firm	Fieldwork date	Sample size	Resp.	R	SV	MDG	Ap	Sp	V	KrF	H	FrP	Others	Lead
2021 election	13 Sep 2021	–	–	3.9	6.8	4.7	25.8	8.8	6.9	2.0	27.4	10.5	3.2	1.6
Respons Analyse	6–9 Sep 2021	800	–	4.4	7.6	6.1	24.2	8.1	8.7	2.6	25.3	10.8	2.2	1.1
Norstat	4–9 Sep 2021	600	–	2.8	7.1	6.4	25.5	6.7	7.6	3.5	27.0	11.2	2.2	1.5
Sentio	30 Aug–4 Sep 2021	801	–	5.3	8.1	6.5	24.2	9.2	7.2	1.8	25.7	8.2	3.8	1.5
Norstat	23–29 Aug 2021	1,000	71.0	3.1	7.6	6.0	23.6	8.3	6.5	2.2	29.3	10.0	3.3	5.7
Norstat	6–11 Aug 2021	600	–	3.3	5.7	4.8	25.4	12.7	4.6	1.9	28.0	10.6	3.0	2.6
Sentio	4–9 Aug 2021	798	–	4.6	8.0	3.9	26.7	8.9	4.9	2.0	28.0	10.5	2.5	1.3
Norstat	2–6 Jun 2021	600	–	4.4	7.2	4.1	23.0	11.9	2.9	2.0	31.5	9.1	3.9	8.5
Norstat	16–20 Apr 2021	600	–	4.0	7.3	4.4	21.5	9.3	4.3	0.5	35.2	10.9	2.6	13.7
Respons Analyse	25 Jan–3 Feb 2021	800	75.0	2.3	5.1	2.6	21.4	13.4	4.1	1.5	35.3	10.5	3.6	13.9
Sentio	15–20 Nov 2020	800	65.0	2.8	6.6	5.0	22.8	12.0	2.8	1.9	31.5	13.0	1.5	8.7
2017 election	11 Sep 2017	—	—	1.9	5.3	3.7	26.3	6.0	6.5	2.3	31.0	15.1	1.9	4.7

=== Aust-Agder ===
Polling firm	Fieldwork date	Sample size	Resp.	R	SV	MDG	Ap	Sp	V	KrF	H	FrP	Others	Lead
2021 election	13 Sep 2021	–	–	3.7	5.5	3.0	24.5	13.5	3.2	8.7	20.2	13.3	1.2	4.3
Respons Analyse	3–8 Sep 2021	600	78.0	3.1	7.4	3.8	23.0	12.1	4.4	9.9	19.6	12.2	4.5	3.4
Norstat	3–7 Sep 2021	600	–	3.6	7.1	4.4	24.0	10.8	2.9	7.9	22.0	15.2	2.0	2.0
Norstat	5–9 Aug 2021	600	–	2.7	6.7	3.9	23.1	15.5	2.6	6.3	24.1	10.7	4.4	1.0
Respons Analyse	16–21 Jun 2021	600	–	2.3	7.1	3.4	25.1	16.0	2.5	7.5	20.2	11.7	4.2	4.9
Norstat	4–7 Jun 2021	600	–	2.7	3.6	4.0	24.7	15.0	1.1	8.9	24.7	10.7	4.7	Tie
Norstat	12–15 Apr 2021	600	–	3.9	6.5	2.3	20.9	14.8	2.7	7.2	25.9	11.4	4.4	5.0
Respons Analyse	23–25 Mar 2021	600	–	3.2	4.6	2.3	20.5	16.3	2.7	7.5	23.7	15.6	3.6	3.2
Respons Analyse	14–19 Oct 2020	600	–	2.7	6.6	3.2	20.7	15.2	3.1	6.1	24.1	16.8	1.5	3.4
InFact	3 May 2018	1,028	–	2.7	4.9	1.9	24.6	8.2	3.1	10.1	23.2	19.1	2.3	1.4
2017 election	11 Sep 2017	—	—	1.2	4.0	2.6	25.4	8.3	3.3	9.8	25.6	17.3	2.4	0.2

=== Buskerud ===
Polling firm	Fieldwork date	Sample size	Resp.	R	SV	MDG	Ap	Sp	V	KrF	H	FrP	Others	Lead
2021 election	13 Sep 2021	–	–	3.5	5.6	3.0	28.4	16.1	3.6	2.3	22.0	12.2	0.2	6.4
Norstat	3–9 Sep 2021	600	–	2.9	6.4	5.1	27.5	12.6	3.3	2.7	23.4	13.4	2.7	4.1
Sentio	24 Aug–2 Sep 2021	600	–	3.7	7.5	4.6	27.1	16.4	4.4	2.4	20.4	12.5	0.9	6.7
Norstat	5–9 Aug 2021	600	–	2.7	6.6	4.4	25.9	18.8	2.6	2.0	19.7	14.0	3.4	6.2
Norstat	4–8 Jun 2021	600	–	3.1	5.7	2.5	28.3	20.1	1.4	2.6	25.1	9.2	2.1	8.2
Norstat	14–19 Apr 2021	600	–	2.5	6.0	3.2	29.1	18.2	1.8	2.3	23.1	11.0	2.8	6.0
Sentio	8–11 Mar 2021	602	–	1.4	6.6	3.2	23.7	23.4	3.4	1.9	25.0	9.7	1.9	1.3
Respons Analyse	20 Jan–1 Feb 2021	809	75.0	2.2	7.6	2.1	22.9	21.2	2.1	2.3	27.2	11.0	1.4	4.3
Sentio	26 Aug–1 Sep 2020	60	–	3.6	6.7	5.5	21.7	15.8	3.7	1.7	32.2	7.1	2.1	10.5
Sentio	30 Jan–7 Feb 2020	600	–	2.5	5.0	6.1	25.9	18.0	2.2	1.4	18.2	19.7	1.1	6.2
2017 election	11 Sep 2017	—	—	1.5	5.0	2.7	28.3	10.8	3.7	2.6	26.9	17.3	1.3	1.4

=== Finnmark ===
Polling firm	Fieldwork date	Sample size	Resp.	R	SV	MDG	Ap	Sp	PF	V	KrF	H	FrP	Others	Lead
2021 election	13 Sep 2021	–	–	5.0	6.2	2.3	31.4	18.4	12.7	1.4	1.7	6.8	10.8	1.2	13.0
Norstat	31 Aug–6 Sep 2021	750	–	5.1	9.3	3.3	27.3	18.5	11.3	2.0	1.9	7.2	11.5	2.6	8.8
InFact	31 Aug 2021	1,022	–	7.7	5.7	4.2	27.3	15.0	–	0.8	1.8	8.5	10.3	18.7	12.3
Kantar TNS	26 Aug 2021	–	–	6.5	7.7	3.5	30.1	17.9	6.3	2.0	2.7	7.7	12.6	2.3	12.2
InFact	23 Aug 2021	641	–	5.3	6.4	4.1	26.2	15.2	12.4	1.8	1.6	9.9	13.6	3.5	11.0
Respons Analyse	12–16 Aug 2021	600	–	7.2	7.5	2.2	29.4	18.5		2.2	2.0	7.6	12.9	8.2	10.9
Norstat	28 Jul–2 Aug 2021	600	–	4.8	7.3	1.5	29.0	25.5		1.8	1.9	10.6	9.9	7.9	3.5
InFact	28 Jun 2021	1,006	–	5.4	7.5	2.5	27.8	20.5		1.2	1.3	10.5	11.1	12.2	7.3
Norstat	26–29 May 2021	600	–	7.1	5.9	0.9	26.0	26.7		1.1	2.8	9.1	13.8	6.7	0.7
InFact	26 Apr 2021	1,000	–	5.1	7.5	1.9	26.6	25.5		1.9	2.8	8.9	11.0	8.8	1.1
Norstat	7–10 Apr 2021	600	–	4.2	7.2	1.9	23.2	35.9		1.2	0.6	11.4	8.4	6.0	12.7
InFact	24 Mar 2021	1,033	–	5.5	7.2	2.1	26.7	27.0		1.7	1.7	9.8	11.7	6.7	0.3
Respons Analyse	2–4 Mar 2021	801	–	3.8	8.4	2.4	23.6	28.6		3.1	1.9	11.9	14.2	2.1	5.0
InFact	9 Feb 2021	1,033	–	4.8	8.4	1.6	27.4	26.7		2.0	1.3	10.9	13.8	3.1	0.7
InFact	8 Sep 2020	1,000	–	5.2	10.7	4.0	27.2	23.1		1.4	1.7	10.4	13.9	2.3	4.1
InFact	18 Dec 2018	1,019	–	3.8	9.4	1.8	30.0	21.6		2.7	2.2	13.2	13.0	2.4	8.4
InFact	19–20 Nov 2018	982	–	4.2	9.4	2.6	33.7	17.0		2.9	1.5	12.1	13.8	2.9	16.7
InFact	5 Apr 2018	835	–	3.4	10.4	1.3	30.8	16.2		3.2	2.7	12.2	18.1	1.8	12.7
Sentio	8–12 Mar 2018	600	72.0	1.8	10.2	1.5	30.5	20.5		3.4	1.2	13.4	13.3	4.3	10.0
InFact	13 Feb 2018	615	–	2.6	11.1	2.4	30.6	13.5		4.2	2.8	15.1	16.7	1.2	13.9
2017 election	11 Sep 2017	—	—	1.5	8.8	2.1	32.0	14.9	–	4.2	2.1	14.4	18.0	1.9	17.1

=== Hedmark ===
Polling firm	Fieldwork date	Sample size	Resp.	R	SV	MDG	Ap	Sp	V	KrF	H	FrP	Others	Lead
2021 election	13 Sep 2021	–	–	3.4	6.9	2.1	33.1	28.0	2.3	1.6	10.6	8.4	1.5	5.1
Norstat	3–7 Sep 2021	600	–	3.9	7.8	2.6	32.4	25.3	2.7	1.4	12.6	7.3	4.1	7.1
Sentio	17–22 Aug 2021	600	–	3.3	7.2	2.0	33.4	26.1	2.5	2.1	9.5	7.4	6.8	7.3
Norstat	9–12 Aug 2021	600	–	4.1	8.4	3.6	28.6	26.7	5.1	1.2	10.5	7.2	4.6	1.9
Norstat	5–11 Aug 2021	600	–	3.9	7.0	3.2	32.6	28.6	2.1	1.3	10.8	6.5	3.9	4.0
Norstat	4–6 Jun 2021	600	–	2.3	8.4	0.9	28.7	34.1	3.0	1.6	11.4	7.5	2.1	5.4
Sentio	27 Apr–4 May 2021	622	–	2.3	5.5	2.7	30.3	30.9	1.4	2.5	14.5	7.5	2.4	0.6
Norstat	15–19 Apr 2021	600	–	2.1	6.3	1.8	28.3	35.9	2.2	1.4	10.7	8.9	2.4	7.6
Sentio	12–19 Jan 2021	600	–	2.7	5.2	2.3	26.5	39.5	1.8	1.5	12.1	7.3	1.0	13.0
Sentio	23 Oct–4 Nov 2020	600	68.0	1.0	8.0	3.4	23.2	36.3	2.5	1.8	12.0	10.0	1.8	13.1
Sentio	26–31 Aug 2020	600	–	4.5	6.8	2.5	26.7	27.9	2.7	2.0	17.0	8.5	1.5	1.2
Sentio	28–31 Jan 2020	600	–	2.0	6.2	2.4	34.0	29.6	2.3	1.5	9.8	10.3	1.9	4.4
Sentio	9–12 Dec 2019	600	–	3.2	6.9	3.4	31.8	29.4	2.3	0.9	13.0	7.2	1.8	2.4
2017 election	11 Sep 2017	—	—	1.3	5.7	1.9	35.6	22.2	2.3	1.8	15.3	11.7	2.2	13.4

=== Hordaland ===
Polling firm	Fieldwork date	Sample size	Resp.	R	SV	MDG	Ap	Sp	V	KrF	H	FrP	Others	Lead
2021 election	13 Sep 2021	–	–	4.7	8.9	3.9	22.7	9.9	4.3	4.9	24.5	12.6	3.6	1.8
Sentio	6–9 Sep 2021	860	79.0	3.9	9.8	6.4	20.2	8.0	4.2	5.6	25.3	13.5	3.1	5.1
Respons Analyse	6–9 Sep 2021	804	–	4.5	10.9	4.4	21.8	9.6	4.6	5.5	26.3	9.6	2.8	4.5
Norstat	2–5 Sep 2021	600	–	5.2	9.0	4.0	23.6	6.9	5.6	5.9	23.1	13.3	3.4	0.5
Sentio	31 Aug–8 Sep 2021	1,220	78.0	4.0	10.0	6.0	19.7	9.4	5.8	5.7	24.9	11.7	2.8	5.2
Sentio	30 Aug–7 Sep 2021	1,215	78.0	3.7	10.7	6.4	19.4	9.3	6.1	5.5	24.4	11.7	3.0	5.0
Sentio	30 Aug–6 Sep 2021	1,218	81.0	4.0	11.2	6.7	19.1	10.0	5.7	5.7	24.4	10.3	2.8	5.3
Sentio	26 Aug–4 Sep 2021	1,212	–	4.3	11.8	6.4	18.7	9.9	5.3	5.8	25.0	10.3	2.6	6.3
Respons Analyse	30 Aug–2 Sep 2021	800	76.0	3.5	9.7	6.4	21.3	9.2	5.3	5.5	21.6	14.2	3.3	0.3
Sentio	26 Aug–2 Sep 2021	1,006	83.0	4.1	12.8	6.3	17.5	10.4	5.4	5.6	25.3	10.0	2.5	7.8
Respons Analyse	16–19 Aug 2021	800	77.0	5.2	9.2	4.1	22.1	10.8	4.2	3.9	25.8	11.9	2.8	3.7
Sentio	13–19 Aug 2021	1,003	77.0	6.5	9.0	7.1	19.7	11.4	2.8	7.5	22.3	9.8	3.7	2.6
Norstat	9–12 Aug 2021	802	72.0	6.5	8.8	5.0	23.3	9.2	3.1	3.9	26.6	9.5	4.1	3.3
Norstat	2–5 Aug 2021	600	–	3.4	6.5	4.3	24.0	11.8	2.6	3.8	28.1	10.5	5.2	4.1
Sentio	16–17 Jun 2021	1,000	77.0	5.5	7.7	4.4	20.5	13.0	2.3	4.5	25.2	12.4	4.4	4.7
Respons Analyse	14–18 Jun 2021	800	75.0	5.0	8.4	4.2	22.3	12.5	3.4	5.6	25.0	11.7	2.2	2.7
Norstat	27 May–3 Jun 2021	600	–	4.1	9.8	3.6	18.4	14.5	3.5	4.8	27.3	9.5	4.4	8.9
Respons Analyse	11–18 May 2021	601	75.0	4.1	7.7	5.0	20.7	15.3	2.3	4.5	29.1	9.6	1.7	8.4
Sentio	7–11 May 2021	1,014	–	4.1	8.4	3.5	20.4	11.1	3.4	6.2	28.3	10.8	3.8	7.9
Norstat	12–15 Apr 2021	600	–	4.1	7.1	2.9	19.1	13.8	3.7	6.4	28.7	10.7	3.5	9.6
Respons Analyse	12–19 Apr 2021	604	68.0	2.6	9.5	5.6	21.6	13.3	4.2	4.0	26.4	11.2	1.6	4.8
Sentio	17–22 Mar 2021	1,033	60.0	5.6	7.2	4.4	18.6	13.1	3.3	4.5	31.4	10.2	1.7	12.8
Respons Analyse	4–8 Mar 2021	601	70.0	3.5	8.6	3.7	21.7	13.3	2.8	5.0	29.6	8.7	3.1	7.9
Respons Analyse	18–25 Jan 2021	800	77.0	3.7	10.2	4.1	17.9	13.7	2.8	4.5	32.7	7.8	2.6	14.8
Respons Analyse	8–11 Dec 2020	600	81.0	3.5	7.5	3.5	19.0	18.4	4.7	4.3	27.1	10.0	2.0	8.1
Sentio	30 Nov–7 Dec 2020	1,000	70.3	3.4	9.8	5.7	18.8	15.5	3.7	2.9	27.0	10.9	2.3	8.2
Respons Analyse	20–24 Aug 2020	602	70.0	3.9	6.8	5.1	21.8	8.7	3.8	5.1	35.0	9.2	0.6	13.2
2017 election	11 Sep 2017	—	—	2.1	7.0	3.5	22.8	7.6	4.4	5.5	30.4	15.1	1.6	7.6

=== Møre og Romsdal ===
Polling firm	Fieldwork date	Sample size	Resp.	R	SV	MDG	Ap	Sp	V	KrF	H	FrP	Others	Lead
2021 election	13 Sep 2021	–	–	3.3	6.3	2.5	20.2	17.5	2.9	5.3	16.3	22.1	3.6	1.9
Respons Analyse	3–7 Sep 2021	800	79.0	3.5	6.5	3.8	18.8	18.3	2.8	7.1	16.3	19.3	3.8	0.5
Norstat	2–5 Sep 2021	600	–	4.0	8.2	2.7	18.7	17.8	3.3	5.7	15.2	19.1	5.2	0.4
Respons Analyse	16–19 Aug 2021	600	74.0	4.2	6.9	5.7	17.7	18.8	2.5	5.4	17.3	16.4	5.1	1.1
Norstat	2–10 Aug 2021	600	–	4.4	6.3	2.1	19.1	24.1	1.7	5.1	15.3	16.9	5.1	5.0
Norstat	27–31 May 2021	787	–	2.6	4.1	3.1	17.3	20.3	2.2	5.2	23.0	18.0	4.1	2.7
Respons Analyse	24–26 May 2021	787	–	2.6	5.9	3.4	19.8	21.3	2.4	6.2	19.5	15.4	3.5	1.5
Norstat	9–13 Apr 2021	600	–	2.2	5.4	1.8	20.8	20.9	1.9	5.0	21.1	18.3	2.6	0.2
Respons Analyse	2–8 Feb 2021	800	–	2.7	5.8	2.5	16.7	24.0	1.5	3.8	24.7	13.6	4.7	0.7
Respons Analyse	5–6 Jun 2020	800	–	2.2	6.6	3.4	16.8	18.6	2.2	6.0	23.4	18.5	2.3	4.8
Respons Analyse	20–21 Mar 2018	601	81.0	1.5	4.4	1.4	18.6	12.5	3.3	6.5	22.8	26.8	2.2	4.0
2017 election	11 Sep 2017	—	—	1.2	3.9	2.2	21.3	13.0	3.5	6.1	23.6	22.3	1.3	2.3

=== Nord-Trøndelag ===
Polling firm	Fieldwork date	Sample size	Resp.	R	SV	MDG	Ap	Sp	V	KrF	H	FrP	Others	Lead
2021 election	13 Sep 2021	–	–	4.0	5.7	1.9	33.6	28.8	2.0	2.3	10.6	8.0	3.1	4.8
Norstat	1–3 Sep 2021	600	–	4.8	8.4	2.7	29.1	26.9	2.4	2.3	10.5	10.3	2.5	2.2
Sentio	25 Aug–6 Sep 2021	600	–	3.6	8.7	3.3	27.0	27.5	2.9	1.7	12.2	9.3	3.9	0.5
Respons Analyse	19–23 Aug 2021	600	–	3.8	7.5	3.7	30.7	25.4	1.7	3.1	13.9	6.4	3.8	5.3
Norstat	29 Jul–10 Aug 2021	600	–	4.0	4.5	1.8	32.0	32.9	2.0	2.1	9.4	6.7	4.7	0.9
Sentio	14–15 Jun 2021	601	–	3.2	7.0	0.8	28.7	33.8	1.5	2.2	11.9	8.2	2.8	5.1
Norstat	26–31 May 2021	600	–	4.6	8.4	1.3	27.3	36.1	2.3	3.2	10.2	4.4	2.1	8.8
Norstat	7–10 Apr 2021	600	–	3.5	5.8	2.3	27.1	33.9	1.0	2.2	11.4	8.3	4.5	6.8
Sentio	25 Mar–9 Apr 2021	600	69.0	2.2	8.1	1.6	24.7	36.4	0.8	2.9	12.7	7.6	3.1	11.7
Norstat	2–7 Feb 2021	598	–	3.3	5.8	1.2	25.7	35.2	1.3	2.9	14.0	7.7	2.9	9.5
Sentio	3–21 Nov 2020	600	73.0	2.0	8.4	3.4	24.9	33.8	2.3	2.7	12.5	7.3	2.7	8.9
Norstat	15 Sep 2020	–	–	2.1	6.6	2.2	21.1	34.2	3.0	2.6	15.5	10.0	2.6	13.1
Sentio	25 Aug–8 Sep 2020	602	72.8	3.1	7.7	2.1	27.1	33.1	1.0	2.0	13.4	10.3	0.2	6.0
InFact	23 Mar 2020	1,068	–	1.7	5.6	1.7	32.6	40.2	2.0	1.0	12.0	3.3	0.0	7.6
Norstat	19–25 Mar 2020	600	–	2.9	6.9	2.1	29.8	34.3	1.1	2.3	10.8	8.7	1.1	4.5
Sentio	7–18 Feb 2020	500	–	3.3	5.5	2.1	29.1	34.1	1.3	2.3	9.3	10.9	2.1	5.0
Sentio	25–30 Nov 2019	600	–	4.3	5.8	1.6	32.8	33.7	1.2	2.5	9.8	7.2	1.0	0.9
Sentio	21–27 Mar 2018	300	77.7	3.2	3.0	1.9	29.4	28.3	1.4	4.9	14.4	11.9	1.7	1.1
2017 election	11 Sep 2017	—	—	1.6	5.0	1.8	34.2	24.4	2.2	2.7	14.8	11.5	0.8	9.8

=== Nordland ===
Polling firm	Fieldwork date	Sample size	Resp.	R	SV	MDG	Ap	Sp	V	KrF	H	FrP	Others	Lead
2021 election	13 Sep 2021	–	–	5.4	7.2	2.3	28.8	21.2	2.5	2.0	15.3	12.2	3.1	7.6
Norstat	31 Aug–4 Sep 2021	600	–	6.7	8.6	3.6	26.9	19.2	2.8	2.2	17.6	10.0	2.3	7.7
Respons Analyse	30 Aug–1 Sep 2021	600	78.0	6.6	11.3	2.6	23.4	18.1	2.4	1.9	15.5	15.7	2.5	5.3
InFact	31 Aug 2021	1,017	–	5.4	7.8	4.6	26.0	22.4	2.5	1.7	14.0	12.9	2.6	3.6
InFact	23 Aug 2021	615	–	7.9	5.4	3.0	24.4	21.3	3.9	1.5	19.6	8.3	4.8	3.1
Norstat	29 Jul–2 Aug 2021	600	–	6.6	7.4	1.4	23.7	25.5	2.6	1.7	14.6	13.2	3.2	1.8
InFact	28 Jun 2021	1,001	–	6.1	7.0	2.8	25.9	23.2	2.0	1.5	16.0	12.9	2.6	2.7
Norstat	7–10 Jun 2021	600	–	4.9	7.5	1.5	21.7	26.1	1.5	2.3	17.3	14.1	3.0	4.4
Norstat	7–10 Apr 2021	600	–	5.2	8.6	1.6	18.5	28.1	2.2	1.6	17.4	13.9	3.0	9.6
InFact	25 Mar 2021	1,055	–	4.9	7.2	3.2	21.8	24.8	1.3	1.8	16.9	15.6	2.4	3.0
Respons Analyse	26 Feb–2 Mar 2021	800	77.0	4.2	9.7	2.7	23.1	27.1	2.6	0.9	16.5	10.8	2.4	4.0
InFact	24 Nov 2020	1,010	–	4.8	7.9	2.0	22.9	28.4	1.2	1.6	15.6	13.1	2.5	5.5
InFact	8 Sep 2020	1,000	–	4.2	9.4	1.7	20.5	22.5	2.1	2.1	20.9	14.4	2.2	2.0
InFact	13 Feb 2018	827	–	2.9	7.4	1.5	22.1	19.1	1.7	2.9	24.2	16.6	1.6	2.1
2017 election	11 Sep 2017	—	—	2.9	7.0	2.2	26.0	18.6	2.6	2.4	20.2	16.5	1.6	1.6

=== Oppland ===
Polling firm	Fieldwork date	Sample size	Resp.	R	SV	MDG	Ap	Sp	V	KrF	H	FrP	Others	Lead
2021 election	13 Sep 2021	–	–	3.6	5.6	2.3	35.0	26.0	2.4	1.6	12.5	8.6	2.4	9.0
Norstat	4–7 Sep 2021	600	99.9	5.6	6.0	4.0	31.2	22.9	4.0	2.1	11.3	10.9	2.1	8.3
Respons Analyse	10–13 Aug 2021	600	–	3.1	6.9	3.2	32.1	29.4	1.9	1.7	13.4	6.1	2.2	2.7
Norstat	6–10 Aug 2021	600	–	4.6	5.3	2.9	30.9	26.6	2.9	1.7	12.4	9.9	2.7	4.3
Norstat	2–6 Jun 2021	600	–	2.8	5.3	2.3	29.3	35.1	1.9	1.4	11.5	7.8	2.5	5.8
Sentio	27 Apr–4 May 2021	577	–	2.6	6.4	1.3	31.7	30.7	0.9	0.9	14.3	8.6	2.6	1.0
Norstat	15–19 Apr 2021	600	–	2.8	4.1	2.4	29.6	34.9	1.2	0.9	14.2	7.5	2.4	5.3
Sentio	13–16 Nov 2021	600	–	2.2	7.7	3.8	21.9	38.0	2.1	1.0	15.1	5.0	3.2	16.1
Sentio	23 Oct–4 Nov 2020	600	70.0	2.8	5.3	3.1	28.5	29.6	2.5	1.2	13.2	12.4	1.3	1.1
Sentio	26 Aug–1 Sep 2020	600	–	5.0	3.5	3.5	30.9	26.9	2.7	2.0	15.8	7.6	2.1	4.0
Sentio	20–25 May 2020	600	–	2.0	5.9	2.7	32.5	28.1	2.9	1.0	15.2	9.9	0.9	4.4
Sentio	28–31 Jan 2020	600	–	3.1	4.6	3.0	29.5	30.7	2.0	2.5	14.3	10.1	0.3	1.2
2017 election	11 Sep 2017	—	—	1.7	4.6	2.4	35.1	21.2	2.6	2.1	16.7	12.2	1.4	13.9

=== Oslo ===
Polling firm	Fieldwork date	Sample size	Resp.	R	SV	MDG	Ap	Sp	V	KrF	H	FrP	Others	Lead
2021 election	13 Sep 2021	–	–	8.3	13.3	8.5	23.0	3.1	10.0	1.8	23.5	6.0	2.5	0.5
Respons Analyse	6–10 Sep 2021	801	84.0	7.7	13.6	10.2	23.1	4.3	9.0	2.2	20.1	7.6	2.2	3.0
Kantar TNS	30 Aug–9 Sep 2021	786	83.6	9.7	17.1	8.6	22.0	1.9	11.2	1.4	20.6	5.3	2.3	1.4
Norstat	4–7 Sep 2021	600	–	9.0	16.2	8.9	20.6	2.1	9.8	1.6	25.1	6.0	0.8	4.5
Opinion Perduco	16–18 Aug 2021	609	–	7.5	16.5	11.0	23.4	2.8	8.7	1.1	19.9	8.4	0.7	3.5
Norstat	6–11 Aug 2021	600	–	10.2	10.4	9.7	25.1	3.7	6.6	1.1	24.9	6.8	1.4	0.2
Respons Analyse	4–9 Aug 2021	1,000	78.0	8.1	12.0	9.2	23.5	6.0	6.4	1.4	25.3	6.4	1.7	1.8
Sentio	25–30 Jun 2021	800	–	8.4	12.2	8.4	25.0	4.4	5.6	1.8	25.7	6.5	2.0	0.7
Norstat	14–21 Jun 2021	997	–	8.4	14.2	6.7	26.2	4.1	5.8	1.0	24.8	7.2	1.5	1.4
Respons Analyse	17–19 Jun 2021	603	77.0	9.2	12.4	9.0	19.9	4.7	5.3	1.5	28.6	7.8	1.6	8.7
Norstat	7–9 Jun 2021	600	–	6.8	13.8	7.9	24.4	5.2	6.1	1.9	25.7	6.0	2.2	1.3
Opinion Perduco	3–5 May 2021	603	73.7	7.2	14.7	7.5	24.8	5.3	5.1	2.3	27.4	4.7	0.9	2.6
Norstat	16–20 Apr 2021	600	–	5.4	11.0	8.8	24.6	4.9	6.4	2.5	25.9	8.2	2.3	1.3
Respons Analyse	8–14 Apr 2021	1,000	76.0	7.5	13.5	7.0	21.6	6.7	5.7	0.5	27.2	8.3	2.0	5.6
Norstat	17–22 Mar 2021	699	–	8.5	11.7	6.9	22.5	4.6	6.1	1.5	28.8	7.0	2.4	6.3
Sentio	12–16 Mar 2021	809	59.0	8.1	10.9	7.0	24.9	3.4	5.4	1.2	29.0	9.2	0.9	4.1
Respons Analyse	11–16 Mar 2021	1,000	79.0	7.9	12.4	6.4	23.6	5.6	5.3	1.3	27.9	7.5	2.1	4.3
Respons Analyse	10–15 Dec 2020	1,000	80.0	7.8	11.0	9.1	22.4	5.9	6.0	1.0	27.7	7.1	2.0	5.3
Sentio	2–14 Nov 2020	800	–	6.5	12.3	7.3	25.9	7.5	4.4	0.8	27.7	6.1	1.5	1.8
Norstat	19–25 Oct 2020	684	–	7.2	11.9	9.3	20.9	4.5	6.2	1.7	28.4	7.1	2.9	7.5
Respons Analyse	20–25 Aug 2020	800	76.0	7.4	13.0	7.8	21.4	2.0	7.3	2.2	31.5	7.0	0.4	10.1
2017 election	11 Sep 2017	—	—	6.3	9.3	6.0	28.4	2.1	8.4	2.1	26.4	9.5	1.5	2.0

=== Rogaland ===
Polling firm	Fieldwork date	Sample size	Resp.	R	SV	MDG	Ap	Sp	V	KrF	H	FrP	Others	Lead
2021 election	13 Sep 2021	–	–	3.7	5.1	2.4	22.4	10.4	3.5	8.1	23.9	16.8	3.7	1.5
Norstat	2–7 Sep 2021	600	–	2.7	5.7	3.6	24.2	8.3	3.3	8.4	23.3	18.3	2.2	0.9
Respons Analyse	30 Aug–2 Sep 2021	800	77.0	2.7	6.7	2.5	20.4	10.7	4.7	9.0	20.9	17.6	4.8	0.5
Norstat	2–5 Aug 2021	600	–	3.9	4.1	3.0	23.3	9.8	2.4	4.6	25.0	17.5	6.5	1.7
Respons Analyse	14–17 Jun 2021	800	–	3.3	6.3	2.1	20.3	13.0	3.2	8.8	25.0	14.8	3.2	4.7
Norstat	6–9 Jun 2021	600	–	3.7	3.7	2.3	22.2	13.1	1.5	6.3	30.4	14.7	2.1	8.2
Norstat	12–15 Apr 2021	600	–	2.2	4.9	2.9	19.3	13.6	1.1	5.7	30.6	15.9	3.9	11.3
Respons Analyse	22–24 Mar 2021	800	–	3.6	4.7	2.7	19.8	12.6	3.3	7.3	28.2	15.0	2.8	8.2
Respons Analyse	10–17 Feb 2021	801	78.0	3.3	5.0	3.2	19.2	13.0	2.7	8.6	29.7	12.3	3.1	10.5
Respons Analyse	7–9 Oct 2020	607	–	2.4	6.2	2.6	18.9	12.6	3.2	7.2	25.8	18.7	0.0	6.9
2017 election	11 Sep 2017	—	—	1.2	3.9	2.6	22.4	7.5	3.5	8.4	28.8	19.7	2.0	6.4

=== Sogn og Fjordane ===
Polling firm	Fieldwork date	Sample size	Resp.	R	SV	MDG	Ap	Sp	V	KrF	H	FrP	Others	Lead
2021 election	13 Sep 2021	–	–	4.0	5.9	2.5	26.5	28.4	3.4	3.8	13.7	9.3	2.5	1.9
Norstat	2–7 Sep 2021	600	–	4.0	6.5	4.3	25.5	28.3	3.5	3.5	11.2	10.9	2.3	2.8
InFact	6 Sep 2021	1,034	–	4.0	7.0	3.6	21.5	30.9	2.8	3.9	13.1	10.6	2.6	9.4
Respons Analyse	1–4 Sep 2021	600	–	5.2	6.4	3.2	25.2	27.7	2.6	3.7	14.2	8.2	3.6	2.5
InFact	17 Aug 2021	1,000	–	3.5	8.0	5.8	21.7	29.1	3.1	3.7	12.6	8.2	4.4	7.4
Norstat	2–5 Aug 2021	600	–	3.6	5.4	3.0	21.5	37.3	2.0	3.8	14.2	7.6	1.6	15.8
Norstat	27 May–3 Jun 2021	600	–	3.1	7.0	2.7	22.4	40.3	1.7	2.9	11.4	6.8	1.7	17.9
Respons Analyse	18–24 May 2021	600	76.0	2.1	5.2	2.5	22.5	37.4	2.1	3.0	14.8	8.9	1.5	14.9
InFact	3 May 2021	1,043	–	4.0	4.5	2.5	22.1	36.4	3.2	3.2	14.4	7.4	2.1	14.3
Norstat	12–15 Apr 2021	600	–	2.6	4.7	2.7	20.9	38.8	1.6	3.3	14.5	8.6	2.3	17.9
InFact	10 Feb 2021	1,034	–	4.3	6.7	3.0	17.4	40.2	2.4	3.8	14.0	6.0	2.1	22.8
InFact	15 Dec 2020	1,070	–	3.8	4.3	2.3	16.9	42.5	2.8	4.1	13.4	7.5	2.3	25.6
Respons Analyse	8–14 Dec 2020	600	77.0	1.5	5.6	2.4	19.9	41.5	3.1	3.6	13.3	7.4	1.7	21.6
2017 election	11 Sep 2017	—	—	1.3	4.5	2.3	24.6	29.7	4.1	4.3	18.6	9.9	0.8	5.1

=== Sør-Trøndelag ===
Polling firm	Fieldwork date	Sample size	Resp.	R	SV	MDG	Ap	Sp	V	KrF	H	FrP	Others	Lead
2021 election	13 Sep 2021	–	–	5.6	9.1	4.8	29.8	15.1	4.4	2.2	16.5	8.6	3.9	13.3
Norstat	2–6 Aug 2021	600	–	5.9	10.9	5.7	24.3	14.0	3.2	2.7	19.7	7.9	5.7	4.6
Sentio	25 Aug–6 Sep 2021	703	–	6.1	10.4	6.8	28.3	13.5	4.1	2.2	17.0	7.5	4.1	11.3
Norstat	2–5 Aug 2021	600	–	6.6	8.6	5.3	27.1	17.6	3.0	2.4	17.1	7.8	4.5	9.5
Sentio	14–15 Jun 2021	720	74.0	7.1	9.6	4.6	28.5	16.2	2.3	2.2	17.7	9.3	2.4	10.8
Norstat	27–31 May 2021	600	–	4.5	8.5	5.2	25.9	20.8	2.1	2.2	19.2	7.1	4.4	5.1
InFact	3 May 2021	1,043	–	4.0	4.5	2.5	22.1	36.4	3.2	3.2	14.4	7.4	2.1	14.3
Norstat	9–13 Apr 2021	600	–	5.5	8.7	5.5	28.0	18.6	2.2	2.4	18.5	8.3	2.3	9.4
Sentio	25 Mar–9 Apr 2021	699	72.0	7.4	7.8	6.1	25.8	19.5	1.7	2.3	19.4	6.0	4.0	6.3
Norstat	2–7 Feb 2021	596	–	4.9	7.1	6.2	22.4	20.3	4.1	2.0	21.5	7.0	4.5	0.9
Sentio	3–18 Nov 2020	709	70.0	3.7	8.4	5.1	23.1	19.6	3.2	2.3	18.0	12.3	4.4	3.5
Norstat	15 Sep 2020	–	–	6.3	9.5	5.8	19.8	15.5	3.2	1.8	20.3	12.2	5.6	0.5
Sentio	25 Aug–1 Sep 2020	734	69.6	5.7	9.2	5.8	22.1	15.4	5.1	2.2	20.7	10.8	2.9	1.4
InFact	23 Mar 2020	1,068	–	6.4	7.4	6.9	28.0	15.9	2.8	2.4	19.2	7.6	3.3	8.8
Norstat	19–25 Feb 2020	600	–	6.0	8.4	6.4	30.7	15.9	3.9	2.3	12.6	11.3	2.4	14.8
Sentio	7–12 Feb 2020	719	–	6.9	9.3	5.7	28.0	14.9	3.2	1.5	15.1	12.4	2.8	12.9
Sentio	21–27 Mar 2018	700	79.4	4.5	9.1	3.5	29.6	12.9	3.0	2.3	21.2	11.1	2.7	8.4
2017 election	11 Sep 2017	—	—	2.9	7.7	3.9	32.8	10.7	4.1	2.7	20.7	11.7	2.8	12.1

=== Telemark ===
Polling firm	Fieldwork date	Sample size	Resp.	R	SV	MDG	Ap	Sp	V	KrF	H	FrP	Others	Lead
2021 election	13 Sep 2021	–	–	4.6	6.1	2.8	30.8	16.5	2.3	4.5	15.7	12.7	4.0	14.3
Norstat	3–7 Sep 2021	600	–	5.5	7.7	3.2	28.3	16.2	2.6	4.3	15.7	11.3	5.3	12.1
Sentio	1–5 Sep 2021	600	84.0	5.4	7.7	5.2	23.8	16.1	3.5	5.4	13.2	14.1	5.5	7.7
Norstat	5–9 Jun 2021	600	–	4.8	6.6	3.6	29.0	16.4	2.5	5.0	18.3	10.3	3.6	10.7
Sentio	9–11 Jun 2021	604	66.0	4.9	7.2	2.2	30.9	17.3	1.4	3.7	17.0	10.4	4.9	13.6
Norstat	4–6 Jun 2021	600	–	3.3	6.5	1.7	30.6	23.9	1.4	3.0	14.6	12.5	2.6	6.7
Norstat	12–15 Apr 2021	600	–	4.5	4.7	4.1	26.2	22.7	1.6	2.8	19.8	11.4	2.2	3.5
Sentio	3–12 Feb 2021	604	–	4.4	6.2	3.3	26.5	21.2	1.5	4.4	18.9	10.2	3.5	5.3
Respons Analyse	10–15 Feb 2020	800	77.0	3.9	6.4	3.4	25.4	23.3	2.0	4.2	20.5	8.3	2.6	2.1
Sentio	29 Jan–6 Feb 2020	500	72.4	2.7	4.9	5.1	30.0	19.0	2.3	3.7	15.3	15.7	1.3	11.0
2017 election	11 Sep 2017	—	—	2.1	5.0	2.5	31.9	12.9	2.7	5.0	20.1	16.5	1.4	11.8

=== Troms ===
Polling firm	Fieldwork date	Sample size	Resp.	R	SV	MDG	Ap	Sp	V	KrF	H	FrP	Others	Lead
2021 election	13 Sep 2021	–	–	4.8	10.8	3.0	27.1	19.1	2.5	2.2	13.5	14.0	3.0	8.0
Norstat	31 Aug–4 Sep 2021	600	–	4.0	13.4	4.6	22.2	16.4	3.4	2.5	13.8	15.2	4.7	5.8
InFact	23 Aug 2021	626	–	4.8	11.0	5.0	24.6	20.6	1.2	2.7	12.2	13.4	4.5	4.0
Norstat	29 Jul–1 Aug 2021	600	–	4.0	11.9	3.0	22.4	25.6	1.7	2.3	15.8	12.1	1.3	3.2
InFact	28 Jun 2021	1,016	–	6.2	11.0	4.6	24.1	22.2	1.6	1.6	12.5	13.7	2.5	1.9
Norstat	26–29 May 2021	600	–	2.8	10.6	2.7	24.4	23.8	2.0	1.9	16.8	12.0	2.9	0.6
Norstat	7–10 Apr 2021	600	–	4.5	10.9	3.4	19.1	25.4	0.8	2.1	17.0	13.6	3.1	6.3
InFact	23 Mar 2021	1,013	–	5.4	10.4	4.6	21.4	25.8	2.0	1.6	13.4	12.7	2.7	4.4
InFact	8 Sep 2020	1,000	–	3.4	10.4	3.1	21.9	20.8	2.3	2.2	18.5	15.1	2.3	3.4
InFact	23 May 2018	1,025	–	5.7	9.0	2.4	21.5	16.9	2.1	3.3	20.0	17.3	1.7	1.5
Sentio	8–12 Mar 2018	600	74.0	2.3	11.1	3.8	20.5	19.7	2.4	2.5	20.2	15.9	1.7	0.3
InFact	13 Feb 2018	794	–	3.5	10.1	2.6	19.7	14.5	3.7	3.3	23.5	18.5	0.0	3.8
2017 election	11 Sep 2017	—	—	2.3	10.1	2.8	24.0	15.0	2.9	2.6	20.5	18.2	1.4	3.5

=== Vest-Agder ===
Polling firm	Fieldwork date	Sample size	Resp.	R	SV	MDG	Ap	Sp	V	KrF	H	FrP	Others	Lead
2021 election	13 Sep 2021	–	–	3.2	5.3	3.2	20.8	10.3	3.6	13.9	21.3	13.1	5.3	0.5
Respons Analyse	3–8 Sep 2021	601	83.0	4.1	6.1	3.7	19.7	7.5	3.7	14.7	21.0	13.9	5.6	1.3
Norstat	2–7 Sep 2021	600	–	3.9	6.4	3.4	19.1	11.6	4.7	14,.1	19.7	13.0	4.2	0.6
Norstat	5–11 Aug 2021	600	–	2.5	6.2	2.7	17.9	16.3	4.0	11.0	22.9	12.2	4.4	5.0
Respons Analyse	16–21 Jun 2021	602	–	3.4	5.9	5.1	21.5	12.8	2.5	12.9	22.8	8.3	4.8	1.3
Norstat	2–6 Jun 2021	600	–	2.1	6.2	4.4	20.7	13.0	2.2	12.3	21.5	13.8	3.9	0.8
Norstat	12–15 Apr 2021	600	–	1.5	4.2	2.4	19.6	10.9	3.3	11.2	30.6	10.4	5.9	11.0
Respons Analyse	23–25 Mar 2021	600	–	1.3	4.4	3.0	19.8	10.4	5.3	13.0	27.1	11.5	4.2	7.3
Respons Analyse	3–10 Feb 2021	800	77.0	3.0	5.4	3.5	18.2	15.7	2.4	10.8	27.0	9.0	5.0	8.8
Respons Analyse	14–19 Oct 2020	600	–	3.1	5.0	3.3	19.2	13.0	3.0	12.0	26.0	12.9	2.5	6.8
2017 election	11 Sep 2017	—	—	1.4	4.3	2.9	21.0	6.5	3.6	12.6	27.9	17.1	2.7	6.9

=== Vestfold ===
Polling firm	Fieldwork date	Sample size	Resp.	R	SV	MDG	Ap	Sp	V	KrF	H	FrP	Others	Lead
2021 election	13 Sep 2021	–	–	4.4	6.2	3.9	27.0	9.9	4.2	3.5	25.1	12.4	4.0	1.9
Norstat	3–9 Sep 2021	600	–	5.5	6.4	4.9	24.5	10.1	4.5	5.0	22.0	13.7	3.4	2.5
Sentio	24 Aug–4 Sep 2021	600	–	6.5	9.5	5.8	23.7	9.3	4.1	4.1	22.3	11.4	3.3	1.4
Sentio	4–13 Aug 2021	667	–	6.2	6.3	2.8	25.1	11.7	3.6	2.9	28.3	11.7	1.3	3.2
Norstat	5–9 Aug 2021	600	–	5.3	7.0	3.5	27.0	9.7	2.5	3.7	24.7	11.2	5.4	2.3
Sentio	9–12 Jun 2021	607	–	5.5	8.4	1.9	25.5	13.2	2.8	2.1	25.4	10.9	4.2	0.1
Norstat	3–6 Jun 2021	600	–	4.0	6.4	3.7	27.2	13.2	2.0	3.7	25.9	10.9	3.0	1.3
Norstat	14–19 Apr 2021	600	–	3.2	7.4	2.7	25.8	9.7	2.4	3.2	34.1	10.3	1.3	8.3
Sentio	3–12 Feb 2021	600	–	4.9	6.0	3.8	21.9	15.3	1.4	3.5	30.3	9.5	3.3	8.4
Respons Analyse	2–8 Feb 2021	802	77.0	3.4	6.0	4.0	22.3	14.0	3.1	2.1	32.3	10.7	2.1	10.0
Sentio	29 Jan–6 Feb 2020	500	70.0	3.2	5.6	6.0	24.5	10.4	4.1	3.6	24.7	17.5	0.3	0.2
2017 election	11 Sep 2017	—	—	1.9	5.0	2.9	28.0	6.3	3.8	3.7	30.1	16.9	1.5	2.1

=== Østfold ===
Polling firm	Fieldwork date	Sample size	Resp.	R	SV	MDG	Ap	Sp	V	KrF	H	FrP	Others	Lead
2021 election	13 Sep 2021	–	–	4.6	6.1	3.0	30.5	14.1	2.9	3.3	18.7	12.7	4.1	11.8
Norstat	4–7 Sep 2021	600	–	5.0	7.7	4.4	27.5	12.9	3.1	2.8	17.8	15.9	3.1	9.7
Sentio	30 Aug–6 Sep 2021	989	79.0	3.6	8.0	3.3	28.7	12.7	3.8	3.7	18.6	13.4	4.2	10.1
Respons Analyse	19–21 Aug 2021	600	–	4.2	6.8	5.9	29.9	14.2	2.9	4.7	18.0	9.1	4.3	11.9
Norstat	6–11 Aug 2021	600	–	5.0	6.3	3.8	29.8	16.1	3.3	2.4	18.9	10.6	3.9	10.9
Norstat	4–9 Aug 2021	1,003	–	6.0	7.4	3.1	28.0	15.4	1.7	3.1	19.0	12.3	3.8	9.0
Norstat	7–10 Jun 2021	600	–	4.3	7.5	2.2	29.5	19.3	1.2	3.1	18.5	11.6	2.9	10.2
Sentio	7–9 Jun 2021	998	–	3.4	6.0	3.3	29.2	19.0	2.3	3.2	18.4	12.5	2.8	10.2
Norstat	14–19 Apr 2021	600	–	4.3	4.6	3.6	28.7	14.5	1.8	3.0	25.0	12.5	2.0	3.7
Respons Analyse	22–25 Feb 2021	802	75.0	3.9	5.7	3.2	28.8	15.9	2.5	2.8	21.9	13.5	1.8	6.9
Sentio	16–20 Jun 2020	600	67.0	4.4	4.2	2.4	30.3	12.6	2.2	2.8	25.7	12.8	2.5	4.6
Sentio	19–25 Jun 2018	600	75.7	4.8	6.3	2.9	26.2	9.8	2.4	3.0	25.5	18.1	1.1	0.7
2017 election	11 Sep 2017	—	—	2.1	4.4	2.6	32.1	8.7	2.4	4.2	23.8	17.5	2.2	8.3

== See also ==
- Opinion polling for the 2017 Norwegian parliamentary election
