= Irene Ojala =

Norwegian politician (born 1960)

Member of the Storting
- In office 1 October 2021 – 30 September 2025
- Constituency: Finnmark

Leader of Patient Focus
- Incumbent
- Assumed office April 2021

Personal details
- Born: 8 October 1960 (age 65) Kiberg, Finnmark, Norway
- Citizenship: Norwegian
- Party: Patient Focus
- Education: University of the Arctic

Irene Ojala (born 8 October 1960) is a Norwegian politician of the party Patient Focus in Finnmark.

== Education ==
She is a trained social planner and has a bachelor's degree in High North studies.

== Career ==
She is the leader of the voluntary organization Patient Focus and the foundation Alta Hospital with Patient Focus.

=== Parliament ===
In 2021, Ojala won election to the Storting as a representative from Finnmark.

Following the Storting meeting regarding the electricity prices in September 2022, Ojala was denied to hold a speech because her party was considered an electoral list rather than a political party. She called it "undemocratic". The President of the Storting argued that she still could have held her speech had she asked to participate during the three minutes of discussion.

In the 2025 Norwegian parliamentary election, Patient Focus received 10.9% of the vote in Finnmark, a reduction from 12.9% in the 2021 election. Ojala did not win reelection to the Storting.
