= Patient Focus =

Norwegian political party

Patient Focus Pasientfokus
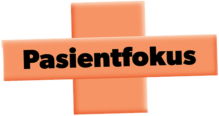
- Abbreviation: PF
- Leader: Irene Ojala
- Founded: April 2021
- Headquarters: Måsesvingen 15, 9512 Alta
- Ideology: Single-issue politics; Regionalism
- Colours: Salmon
- Storting: 0 / 169

Website
- pasientfokus.no

Patient Focus (Norwegian: Pasientfokus, PF) is a minor political organisation in Norway. It was formed in April 2021, as a support movement for an expansion of the hospital in the town of Alta, in Finnmark. In the 2021 parliamentary election, it won one of Finnmark's five seats in the Storting. The party's leader, Irene Ojala, held the seat until 2025.

== History ==
PF started as the 'Postkortaksjonen' (Postcard campaign) in 2017, campaigning to get better healthcare services in the Alta and Kautokeino municipalities. They organised postcards being sent to the Storting, describing their problems with healthcare.

In 2021, the organisation submitted an electoral list in 2021 in order to take part in the parliamentary election that year. After winning her seat, the leader Ojala took a position on the Health and Care Committee in the Storting.

The party ran in the 2025 election, losing its seat.

== Positions ==
The party is considered to be single-issue, focusing primarily on the hospital and healthcare for the region. However, in 2021 it plans to use direct democracy among its constituents to determine other policy positions.

== Election results ==
=== Storting ===
Results for PF in the 2021 election, by municipality.

Election	Leader	Votes	% (Finnmark)	Seats (Finnmark)	+/–	Position
2021	Irene Ojala	4,950	12.7	1 / 5	▲1	Opposition
2025	Irene Ojala	4,174	10.3	0 / 5	▼1	Extra-parliamentary

== See also ==
- Hospital to Alta, a similar party which ran in the 2013 Norwegian election
- Independent Kidderminster Hospital and Health Concern, a similar party in Kidderminster, England
