= Opinion polling for the 2017 Norwegian parliamentary election =

In the run up to the 2017 Norwegian parliamentary election, various organisations carried out opinion polling to gauge voting intention in Norway. Results of such polls are displayed in this article.

The date range for these opinion polls are from the previous parliamentary election, held on 8 and 9 September 2013, to the day the next election was held, on 11 September 2017. Unlike most nations, Norway's constitution does not allow early elections before the four-year term limit.

== Opinion polls ==
=== Graphical summary ===
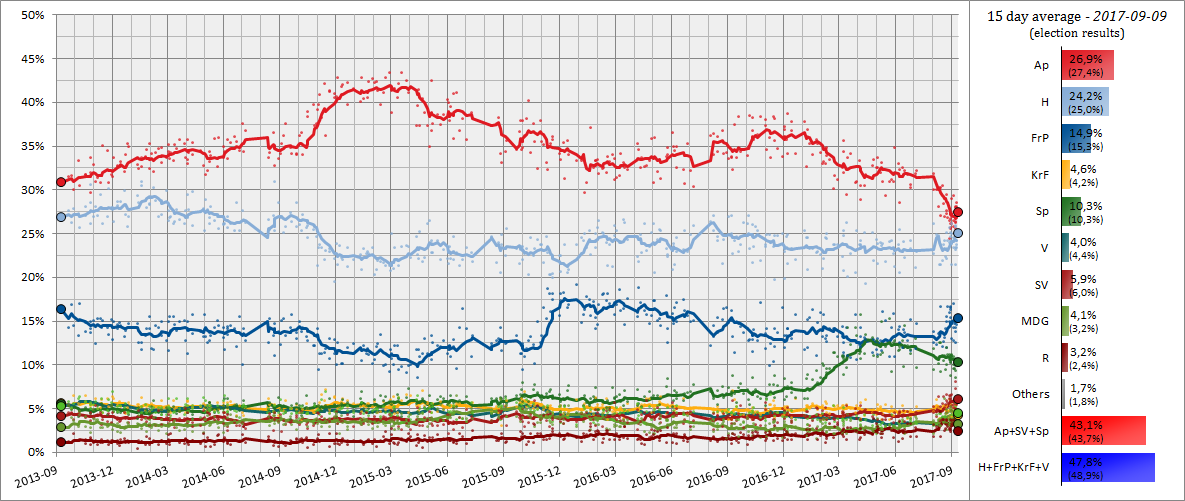
30 day moving average of poll results since the 2013 election, with each line corresponding to a political party.
Longer term polling results based on monthly averages from pollofpolls.

Zoom on the smaller parties.

== Vote share ==
Polling firm	Fieldwork date	Sample size	Resp.	R	SV	MDG	Ap	Sp	V	KrF	H	FrP	Others	Lead	Red	Blue	Lead
2017 election	11 Sep 2017	—	78.2	2.4	6.0	3.2	27.4	10.3	4.4	4.2	25.0	15.2	1.9	2.4	46.1	48.8	2.7
Kantar TNS	4–9 Sep 2017	2,998	81.8	3.1	5.6	3.9	28.1	10.2	4.6	4.4	23.8	14.6	1.7	4.3	47.0	47.4	0.4
Kantar TNS	5–8 Sep 2017	2,002	81.9	3.3	5.5	4.0	28.6	10.5	3.9	4.3	23.4	15.2	1.3	5.2	47.9	46.8	1.1
InFact	7 Sep 2017	2,165	–	3.3	8.1	4.4	28.0	10.7	5.2	4.7	21.5	12.6	1.5	6.5	50.1	44.0	6.1
Opinion Perduco	5–7 Sep 2017	952	82.0	4.9	6.0	5.7	26.4	8.6	2.5	3.4	25.9	15.3	1.3	0.5	45.9	47.1	1.2
Kantar TNS	4–7 Sep 2017	2,003	81.1	3.0	5.7	3.7	28.1	10.1	4.1	5.0	23.4	15.2	1.8	4.7	46.9	47.7	0.8
Norfakta	5–6 Sep 2017	1,001	80.0	3.1	5.0	4.5	26.3	10.5	4.2	5.3	25.8	13.8	0.0	0.5	44.9	50.1	5.2
Ipsos MMI	4–6 Sep 2017	971	–	3.5	6.2	4.4	27.2	9.4	4.7	4.2	23.2	15.3	2.1	4.0	46.3	47.4	1.1
Respons Analyse	4–6 Sep 2017	1,000	–	3.1	7.3	2.7	25.6	9.9	4.5	5.5	24.7	14.3	2.4	0.9	45.9	49.0	3.1
Kantar TNS	1–6 Sep 2017	2,004	–	2.9	5.7	3.7	27.0	10.3	4.3	4.5	24.8	14.8	2.0	2.2	45.9	48.4	2.5
Kantar TNS	31 Aug–5 Sep 2017	2,007	79.9	3.6	5.7	3.4	27.5	9.6	4.7	4.4	24.4	14.7	2.0	3.1	46.4	48.2	1.8
InFact	4 Sep 2017	2,103	–	3.8	5.5	3.9	29.3	10.0	3.9	5.1	23.4	12.8	2.3	5.9	48.6	45.2	3.4
Norstat	31 Aug–4 Sep 2017	1,421	82.8	3.2	5.9	4.6	25.8	9.6	3.5	4.5	24.2	17.0	1.6	1.6	44.5	49.2	4.7
Kantar TNS	30 Aug–4 Sep 2017	1,905	–	3.4	5.1	3.8	26.5	10.9	4.8	4.4	24.5	14.3	2.2	2.0	45.9	48.0	2.1
Kantar TNS	29 Aug–1 Sep 2017	2,008	80.2	3.6	4.8	3.5	26.1	11.0	4.3	3.8	26.1	14.7	2.2	Tie	45.5	48.9	3.4
InFact	31 Aug 2017	2,032	–	3.1	6.6	4.8	29.0	11.2	3.4	5.5	21.5	13.0	2.0	7.5	49.9	43.4	6.5
Kantar TNS	28–31 Aug 2017	1,991	80.2	3.3	5.3	3.2	27.1	11.1	3.8	4.1	25.0	14.9	2.4	2.1	46.8	47.8	1.0
Respons Analyse	28–30 Aug 2017	1,003	–	2.4	6.2	4.7	26.1	8.8	4.9	5.4	23.9	16.6	1.0	2.2	43.5	50.8	7.3
Kantar TNS	25–30 Aug 2017	1,997	80.8	2.8	5.9	3.5	26.7	11.1	3.6	4.2	24.7	15.4	2.0	2.0	46.5	47.9	1.4
Norstat	22–29 Aug 2017	932	–	3.8	5.2	5.2	25.6	10.3	3.1	4.9	24.2	16.7	1.7	1.4	44.9	48.9	4.0
Kantar TNS	24–29 Aug 2017	1,789	79.3	2.6	6.5	3.6	25.7	10.4	3.9	4.2	25.1	16.3	1.7	0.6	45.2	49.5	4.3
Norstat	24–28 Aug 2017	987	–	2.7	6.1	4.2	24.4	10.6	3.3	6.0	25.7	15.0	2.0	1.3	43.8	50.0	6.2
Kantar TNS	22–28 Aug 2017	1,891	79.2	2.6	6.5	3.9	26.5	11.2	3.7	4.0	24.0	16.0	1.6	2.5	46.8	47.7	0.9
Kantar TNS	21–25 Aug 2017	1,694	79.2	2.9	5.7	4.6	26.8	11.2	3.1	3.7	24.2	16.7	1.2	2.6	46.6	47.7	1.1
InFact	23 Aug 2017	2,043	–	3.6	6.6	4.9	27.6	12.0	3.6	5.3	22.2	12.0	2.3	5.4	49.8	43.1	6.7
Ipsos MMI	21–23 Aug 2017	933	–	3.8	5.9	2.6	29.5	10.0	3.4	4.4	23.3	15.0	2.1	6.2			
Kantar TNS	18–23 Aug 2017	1,070	–	3.1	5.5	4.7	27.9	12.1	3.2	3.2	23.3	15.4	1.5	4.6			
Respons Analyse	18–23 Aug 2017	1,000	–	3.2	4.5	3.9	27.3	10.8	3.7	4.5	25.1	15.5	1.5	2.2			
Norstat	15–21 Aug 2017	774	–	2.7	5.5	4.4	29.0	9.5	4.0	5.1	22.4	14.2	3.1	6.6			
Sentio	15–20 Aug 2017	1,000	71.6	2.5	5.1	6.1	27.0	11.1	4.1	5.3	24.2	13.1	1.6	2.8			
Kantar TNS	14–18 Aug 2017	976	75.6	3.8	6.4	3.4	28.4	10.5	3.5	5.3	23.8	12.7	2.2	4.6			
InFact	17 Aug 2017	2,030	–	3.7	5.6	3.9	30.5	10.9	4.1	5.2	21.9	12.1	2.4	8.6			
Norstat	8–14 Aug 2017	756	–	1.8	5.2	4.6	27.1	9.2	3.9	5.0	23.8	16.7	2.7	3.3			
Kantar TNS	7–11 Aug 2017	977	75.6	4.7	3.6	3.1	30.3	12.6	4.4	3.9	21.5	13.7	2.1	8.8			
Respons Analyse	8–10 Aug 2017	1,001	–	2.7	6.4	3.7	28.1	10.1	3.6	5.1	24.8	13.6	1.9	3.3			
Opinion Perduco	1–7 Aug 2017	950	72.0	2.9	4.1	4.3	30.0	10.8	3.2	6.0	24.9	12.3	1.5	5.1			
Norfakta	1–2 Aug 2017	1,006	–	1.8	4.6	2.1	31.9	9.5	3.1	4.7	26.1	13.8	2.5	5.8			
InFact	1–2 Aug 2017	2,015	–	3.2	5.2	3.6	30.0	11.9	3.2	5.2	22.7	12.6	2.3	7.3			
Norfakta	4–5 Jul 2017	1,002	78.0	1.8	4.6	3.9	32.2	9.7	3.3	5.2	22.9	14.7	1.7	9.2			
InFact	3–4 Jul 2017	2,016	–	2.8	4.5	4.1	31.9	13.0	3.5	4.6	21.1	11.9	2.7	10.8			
Norstat	20–26 Jun 2017	935	–	1.8	4.3	3.9	30.6	11.7	3.4	4.1	23.3	15.2	1.7	7.3			
Sentio	22 Jun 2017	1,000	71.1	3.3	4.3	3.9	30.6	11.3	3.6	4.8	24.2	11.6	2.8	6.4			
Ipsos MMI	19–21 Jun 2017	1,005	–	3.3	4.7	3.2	31.7	12.2	4.0	3.9	23.1	12.8	1.2	8.6			
Kantar TNS	12–16 Jun 2017	971	75.4	2.6	3.5	2.1	32.2	14.5	2.8	4.5	22.3	13.7	1.9	9.9			
Respons Analyse	9–14 Jun 2017	1,002	74.0	2.3	4.8	3.1	31.7	9.8	3.5	4.7	24.1	14.0	2.0	7.6			
Opinion Perduco	6–12 Jun 2017	935	72.0	1.6	4.1	3.8	32.6	12.8	3.5	5.3	23.1	12.0	1.3	9.5			
Norfakta	6–7 Jun 2017	1,002	–	2.5	4.7	3.2	28.5	12.1	3.0	4.4	25.5	14.4	1.8	3.0			
InFact	2–7 Jun 2017	2,072	–	3.5	4.5	3.6	32.3	11.3	3.2	4.8	20.5	12.5	3.3	11.8			
Norstat	30 May–5 Jun 2017	927	–	1.2	4.3	2.8	33.0	11.6	3.4	4.4	23.7	14.0	1.6	9.3			
InFact	31 May 2017	1,014	–	2.5	4.6	2.8	34.8	12.8	3.0	4.8	21.2	10.9	2.6	13.6			
Norstat	23–29 May 2017	926	–	1.7	3.4	2.9	31.0	12.5	3.1	4.2	22.7	15.9	2.5	8.3			
Ipsos MMI	22–25 May 2017	929	–	2.5	3.9	2.7	31.2	9.2	4.3	5.2	24.2	14.3	2.5	8.0			
Sentio	16–22 May 2017	1,000	70.6	2.8	4.3	3.1	30.9	15.3	3.2	3.8	24.1	11.0	1.6	6.8			
Opinion Perduco	9–15 May 2017	951	75.0	3.8	4.1	3.1	29.4	12.1	2.9	5.5	21.8	15.1	2.1	7.6			
Respons Analyse	5–10 May 2017	1,000	78.0	2.1	3.8	2.6	30.9	11.4	3.4	4.4	23.9	16.1	1.4	7.0			
Kantar TNS	3–9 May 2017	973	75.3	1.7	4.4	2.1	33.1	15.0	2.8	3.7	23.6	11.6	1.6	9.5			
Norstat	2–8 May 2017	935	–	2.2	4.4	2.6	32.0	11.2	3.2	5.2	24.0	12.8	2.4	8.0			
Norfakta	2–3 May 2017	1,002	–	2.3	3.7	2.9	33.7	11.0	3.2	5.0	23.9	13.0	1.4	9.8			
InFact	2–3 May 2017	2,020	–	3.0	4.4	3.0	32.6	12.7	3.9	5.5	21.6	11.2	2.0	9.0			
Norstat	25 Apr–1 May 2017	942	–	3.3	4.5	3.0	32.6	12.8	2.1	4.3	24.3	11.7	1.4	8.3			
Ipsos MMI	24–26 Apr 2017	933	–	3.9	4.5	2.4	33.5	11.1	4.3	4.9	21.9	12.9	0.6	11.6			
Sentio	18–24 Apr 2017	1,000	66.8	2.0	4.1	2.5	32.8	13.1	3.1	4.5	25.1	11.4	1.3	7.7			
Opinion Perduco	9–11 Apr 2017	953	73.0	2.0	4.8	2.5	30.5	11.3	4.3	4.2	25.1	13.1	2.1	5.4			
InFact	6–10 Apr 2017	2,052	–	2.5	4.9	3.0	31.7	13.5	3.7	6.0	19.3	12.9	2.4	12.3			
Norfakta	4–5 Apr 2017	1,000	75.0	2.7	3.8	2.8	32.2	10.7	3.6	3.8	23.8	14.3	2.2	8.4			
Respons Analyse	3–5 Apr 2017	1,000	–	2.3	5.4	2.6	30.5	11.5	3.6	5.7	23.6	13.2	1.6	6.9			
Kantar TNS	29 Mar–4 Apr 2017	975	–	1.7	4.7	3.1	28.9	15.8	3.2	3.9	24.2	12.1	1.9	4.7			
Norstat	28 Mar–3 Apr 2017	932	–	1.5	4.7	2.6	33.4	11.3	3.7	5.1	23.7	12.3	1.6	9.4			
Ipsos MMI	27–29 Mar 2017	950	–	2.5	3.9	2.4	30.9	13.4	4.2	5.3	25.3	10.6	1.6	5.6			
Norstat	21–27 Mar 2017	953	–	2.5	5.0	2.5	30.8	14.3	2.7	4.5	20.6	15.8	1.3	10.2			
Sentio	14–20 Mar 2017	1,000	68.4	2.8	4.2	3.6	34.1	12.3	3.9	5.0	22.7	10.8	0.7	11.5			
InFact	15 Mar 2017	1,020	–	2.8	4.2	2.7	33.7	14.3	4.3	5.1	20.1	11.1	1.8	13.6			
Opinion Perduco	7–13 Mar 2017	954	71.0	1.5	5.4	2.2	29.5	9.3	3.8	5.5	26.3	14.3	1.9	3.2			
Kantar TNS	9 Mar 2017	1,055	79.7	2.5	4.7	2.1	32.5	11.1	3.6	5.4	23.7	13.5	1.4	8.8			
Norfakta	7–8 Mar 2017	1,000	74.0	2.7	4.5	2.5	34.4	8.9	3.3	4.2	25.3	12.6	2.0	9.1			
InFact	6–8 Mar 2017	2,030	–	1.8	4.3	3.1	35.6	11.0	5.1	4.9	20.8	11.1	2.3	14.8			
Respons Analyse	6–8 Mar 2017	1,001	–	2.6	4.6	3.5	32.0	10.7	3.7	5.4	24.8	11.4	1.3	7.2			
Norstat	28 Feb–6 Mar 2017	927	–	2.0	4.4	2.9	32.8	10.9	3.9	4.6	22.4	14.4	2.5	10.4			
Norstat	21–27 Feb 2017	952	–	3.2	3.4	2.7	31.2	10.9	3.9	5.4	23.8	13.2	2.3	7.4			
Ipsos MMI	20–22 Feb 2017	947	–	3.0	3.8	2.2	31.6	11.4	3.5	5.2	23.8	14.1	1.2	7.8			
Sentio	14–20 Feb 2017	1,000	65.0	1.7	3.9	2.2	30.2	11.4	5.3	5.3	23.7	14.1	2.1	6.5			
Opinion Perduco	7–13 Feb 2017	918	73.0	3.3	4.0	2.6	33.5	9.6	4.0	4.4	23.2	14.2	1.2	10.3			
Kantar TNS	8 Feb 2017	981	72.7	2.0	3.9	3.8	33.2	9.9	3.9	3.8	22.1	15.7	1.6	11.1			
Norfakta	7–8 Feb 2017	1,002	76.0	1.6	3.7	2.4	33.9	9.6	3.9	5.6	25.0	12.7	1.5	8.9			
Respons Analyse	6–8 Feb 2017	–	–	1.8	4.3	2.3	34.8	9.1	3.8	4.6	24.4	13.4	1.5	10.4			
Norstat	31 Jan–6 Feb 2017	935	–	1.1	5.1	3.1	33.0	8.6	3.4	5.8	24.6	13.0	2.3	8.4			
InFact	31 Jan–2 Feb 2017	2,031	–	2.4	4.8	3.3	33.0	10.2	4.4	5.4	21.0	13.2	2.1	12.0			
Norstat	24–30 Jan 2017	935	–	1.9	3.8	3.6	34.3	8.6	3.5	4.2	22.6	16.0	1.6	11.7			
Ipsos MMI	23–25 Jan 2017	944	–	1.5	5.0	2.9	35.3	8.0	3.7	4.9	22.9	14.8	1.0	12.4			
Sentio	17–23 Jan 2017	1,000	68.3	2.7	5.1	1.6	35.7	9.3	4.3	5.4	22.8	12.1	1.0	12.9			
Opinion Perduco	10–16 Jan 2017	944	74.0	2.0	3.6	2.7	34.0	8.3	3.7	5.6	23.3	16.3	0.6	10.7			
Respons Analyse	9–11 Jan 2017	1,002	–	2.6	3.1	2.4	35.3	7.1	4.1	5.0	23.3	15.4	1.7	12.0			
InFact	5–9 Jan 2017	2,003	–	2.2	4.7	3.2	36.9	8.9	3.2	5.4	20.9	12.0	2.6	16.0			
Norstat	3–9 Jan 2017	944	–	1.5	4.1	2.4	36.1	6.1	3.9	5.1	24.5	15.2	1.1	11.6			
Kantar TNS	2–6 Jan 2017	967	–	2.6	4.7	1.9	32.7	8.4	4.9	5.3	24.5	13.6	1.4	8.2			
Norfakta	3–4 Jan 2017	1,000	75.0	1.9	4.2	2.6	37.8	6.2	4.2	4.8	25.3	11.8	1.1	12.5			
Norstat	13–19 Dec 2016	963	–	2.1	4.2	2.9	34.1	6.3	3.8	6.2	22.0	15.7	2.6	12.1			
Ipsos MMI	12–14 Dec 2016	932	–	1.5	3.4	2.9	37.8	6.8	4.8	4.0	23.3	13.0	2.1	14.5			
Sentio	6–13 Dec 2016	1,000	–	1.9	3.6	2.8	36.8	8.0	3.5	4.8	23.3	13.7	1.6	13.5			
Norfakta	6–7 Dec 2016	1,010	77.0	1.5	5.1	2.3	38.7	7.3	2.7	5.2	21.6	14.1	1.6	16.1			
Respons Analyse	5–7 Dec 2016	1,000	79.0	2.2	4.5	2.4	34.1	7.5	4.7	4.4	24.9	14.2	1.1	9.2			
Opinion Perduco	29 Nov–5 Dec 2016	962	72.0	2.4	4.3	2.4	35.8	6.4	4.1	5.2	24.7	13.4	1.3	11.1			
Kantar TNS	28 Nov–2 Dec 2016	978	79.7	1.7	3.9	4.5	37.2	6.0	4.0	4.3	23.0	13.3	2.1	14.2			
InFact	30 Nov–1 Dec 2016	2,007	–	2.6	4.8	3.5	36.9	8.4	4.5	5.2	19.9	12.0	2.1	17.0			
Norstat	22–28 Nov 2016	971	–	1.3	5.0	1.7	33.8	7.2	4.1	4.2	25.0	16.5	1.1	8.8			
Norstat	15–21 Nov 2016	972	–	1.6	3.4	2.5	34.7	7.6	4.7	4.5	24.8	13.7	2.4	9.9			
Ipsos MMI	14–16 Nov 2016	929	–	3.1	3.7	3.5	35.6	6.3	4.5	4.0	24.8	14.1	0.4	10.8			
InFact	9–16 Nov 2016	2,040	–	2.0	4.4	3.6	38.1	8.8	4.2	5.4	19.7	12.1	1.7	18.4			
Sentio	8–14 Nov 2016	1,000	68.7	1.3	3.8	3.4	38.4	7.7	3.5	5.9	23.5	10.4	2.1	14.9			
Opinion Perduco	1–7 Nov 2016	954	73.0	2.4	4.2	3.3	36.0	7.8	4.5	5.5	24.9	9.9	1.5	11.1			
Norfakta	1–2 Nov 2016	1,001	–	1.6	4.1	1.8	34.6	6.1	6.0	4.9	24.9	14.2	1.8	9.7			
Norstat	25–31 Oct 2016	963	–	1.4	4.9	2.5	37.4	6.6	4.0	5.0	23.5	13.6	1.2	13.9			
Kantar TNS	25–31 Oct 2016	974	76.8	2.3	5.7	3.1	38.0	5.3	3.6	4.8	23.7	11.9	1.5	14.3			
Norstat	18–24 Oct 2016	973	–	1.8	3.1	1.7	38.4	6.2	4.0	4.3	21.9	17.1	1.5	16.5			
Ipsos MMI	17–19 Oct 2016	931	–	2.3	4.3	2.6	36.3	6.4	4.5	4.7	25.3	12.8	0.7	11.0			
Sentio	11–16 Oct 2016	1,000	68.0	2.4	3.2	2.6	36.2	7.2	3.0	4.7	25.8	13.3	1.5	10.4			
Respons Analyse	10–12 Oct 2016	1,001	–	1.9	3.7	3.3	35.8	7.0	5.1	4.4	23.5	14.0	1.3	12.3			
InFact	10–11 Oct 2016	2,016	–	1.5	4.2	2.5	38.3	8.5	4.8	5.1	21.7	11.5	1.9	16.6			
Opinion Perduco	4–10 Oct 2016	966	72.0	2.3	3.7	1.9	36.8	6.6	4.5	3.7	26.0	12.9	1.5	10.8			
Norfakta	4–5 Oct 2016	1,001	79.0	1.5	4.2	2.9	38.5	5.5	4.6	4.7	23.3	12.9	1.8	15.2			
Kantar TNS	3 Oct 2016	974	72.8	1.9	4.2	2.4	34.9	6.0	4.3	4.7	27.1	12.8	1.9	7.8			
Norstat	29 Sep–3 Oct 2016	965	–	0.9	3.9	3.9	33.9	7.2	4.0	4.2	26.2	14.1	1.7	7.7			
Norstat	20–26 Sep 2016	961	–	2.0	2.8	3.5	34.6	6.7	3.4	4.3	26.3	13.7	2.8	8.3			
Ipsos MMI	19–21 Sep 2016	909	–	2.0	5.4	3.2	34.4	7.9	4.3	4.3	23.7	14.4	0.3	10.7			
Sentio	13–18 Sep 2016	1,000	74.7	1.1	4.4	1.8	38.4	7.4	3.7	4.4	22.9	14.7	1.2	15.5			
Respons Analyse	12–14 Sep 2016	1,001	–	1.4	3.6	3.8	33.7	5.7	5.2	5.2	24.7	14.9	1.8	9.0			
Opinion Perduco	6–12 Sep 2016	963	73.0	2.0	3.3	3.3	37.5	6.7	4.4	6.0	24.2	11.4	1.2	13.3			
InFact	5–8 Sep 2016	2,039	–	2.1	5.9	2.1	32.3	8.8	3.3	7.1	22.7	13.2	2.4	9.6			
Norfakta	6–7 Sep 2016	1,002	–	1.0	3.3	2.9	33.8	6.5	4.6	3.8	27.1	15.1	2.0	6.7			
Norstat	30 Aug–5 Sep 2016	959	–	1.7	3.7	3.1	33.7	6.9	4.5	4.3	25.0	16.2	0.9	8.7			
TNS Gallup	29 Aug–2 Sep 2016	964	78.5	1.9	4.2	2.1	33.6	7.4	4.9	3.7	26.9	14.8	0.7	6.7			
Norstat	23–29 Aug 2016	963	–	1.5	4.1	1.6	34.3	6.7	4.5	4.9	24.8	16.5	1.1	9.5			
Ipsos MMI	22–24 Aug 2016	929	–	1.5	4.4	3.5	34.1	6.3	3.8	4.4	24.3	16.4	1.4	9.8			
Sentio	16–22 Aug 2016	1,000	68.8	1.7	3.0	3.3	36.8	7.5	4.7	4.5	21.6	15.2	1.8	15.2			
Respons Analyse	18 Aug 2016	–	–	1.2	4.2	2.6	36.1	5.5	4.7	5.2	24.7	13.7	2.1	11.4			
Norstat	9–15 Aug 2016	969	–	1.5	4.2	3.0	34.4	7.1	3.3	4.5	24.2	15.4	2.5	10.2			
Opinion Perduco	2–8 Aug 2016	972	71.0	1.8	2.6	2.4	36.4	6.4	4.6	5.0	25.4	14.5	1.0	11.0			
TNS Gallup	1–5 Aug 2016	982	75.1	1.8	4.4	3.4	34.0	6.1	3.8	4.6	27.1	13.2	1.6	6.9			
Norfakta	2–3 Aug 2016	1,002	–	1.3	3.9	3.5	36.2	6.9	3.7	5.0	26.4	12.2	0.8	9.8			
Norfakta	6–7 Jul 2016	1,001	80.0	1.8	3.6	3.0	30.4	7.7	4.7	5.0	25.9	15.1	2.8	4.5			
TNS Gallup	27 Jun–1 Jul 2016	986	76.9	2.9	4.7	2.6	32.2	7.0	4.5	5.1	24.9	14.9	1.2	7.3			
Norstat	21–27 Jun 2016	974	–	1.2	4.6	4.2	35.3	6.8	3.5	4.4	23.0	15.6	1.3	12.3			
Ipsos MMI	20–22 Jun 2016	933	–	2.0	3.7	3.5	30.7	6.7	4.3	5.0	25.3	16.2	2.5	5.4			
Sentio	14–20 Jun 2016	1,000	70.0	1.4	3.3	4.5	32.3	5.9	4.3	6.1	23.2	17.5	1.5	9.1			
Opinion Perduco	7–13 Jun 2016	962	74.0	2.6	4.4	3.2	35.3	5.4	3.5	5.2	24.4	14.5	1.5	10.9			
Norfakta	7–8 Jun 2016	1,000	73.0	1.0	5.0	3.2	35.0	6.8	5.4	5.1	23.0	14.9	0.6	12.0			
Respons Analyse	6–8 Jun 2016	1,002	79.0	2.1	4.2	2.8	32.5	6.1	4.6	5.0	24.6	17.1	1.0	7.9			
Norstat	31 May–6 Jun 2016	958	–	1.8	4.2	2.8	34.5	7.1	4.2	4.8	21.5	16.6	2.5	13.0			
TNS Gallup	30 May–3 Jun 2016	978	74.6	2.2	4.5	4.1	34.9	5.9	4.8	4.1	23.9	14.7	0.7	11.0			
Norstat	3 Jun 2016	–	–	1.1	5.7	3.4	36.6	5.2	4.1	5.4	20.9	15.9	1.8	15.7			
Ipsos MMI	23–25 May 2016	938	–	2.8	4.5	3.7	34.8	6.5	5.1	5.5	22.6	12.6	1.8	12.2			
Sentio	17–23 May 2016	1,000	70.7	1.1	4.1	3.6	33.8	7.5	3.7	4.4	23.3	17.9	0.6	10.5			
InFact	22 May 2016	2,022	–	2.0	4.6	3.2	34.0	8.4	3.6	5.3	22.4	14.2	2.4	11.6			
Opinion Perduco	9–14 May 2016	972	77.0	2.5	3.4	4.2	31.3	6.2	3.9	6.4	25.4	14.5	2.2	5.9			
Respons Analyse	9–11 May 2016	1,001	77.0	1.4	3.9	3.3	33.5	5.5	4.9	5.8	25.5	15.3	0.9	8.0			
Norstat	3–9 May 2016	962	–	2.4	5.1	2.5	32.1	6.5	5.3	5.3	24.3	15.1	1.3	7.8			
Norfakta	3–4 May 2016	1,003	81.0	2.5	3.7	2.2	36.0	6.1	4.9	5.0	20.5	17.4	1.7	14.2			
Norstat	26 Apr–2 May 2016	973	–	2.0	4.5	2.1	30.8	6.5	4.7	5.2	26.1	17.3	0.8	4.7			
TNS Gallup	25–29 Apr 2016	971	74.4	1.8	2.6	3.0	35.9	6.3	3.8	4.6	25.1	15.6	1.4	10.8			
Sentio	19–25 Apr 2016	1,000	71.9	1.7	4.4	2.3	33.4	6.9	5.2	6.1	23.5	14.7	1.8	9.9			
Ipsos MMI	18–20 Apr 2016	943	–	2.0	5.9	3.2	32.8	5.9	4.7	6.2	23.1	15.8	0.4	9.7			
Opinion Perduco	12–18 Apr 2016	962	73.0	0.9	4.6	2.4	32.7	6.4	3.3	5.5	26.1	16.2	1.9	6.6			
Respons Analyse	11–13 Apr 2016	1,002	78.0	1.0	4.3	3.9	33.7	5.2	5.1	5.5	22.8	16.7	1.8	10.9			
Norstat	5–11 Apr 2016	970	–	1.5	3.5	3.2	32.5	6.0	4.6	5.2	24.9	17.1	1.5	7.6			
Norfakta	5–6 Apr 2016	1,006	78.0	1.5	2.6	3.4	35.3	5.4	5.6	5.1	24.5	16.0	0.6	10.8			
InFact	4–6 Apr 2016	1,000	–	1.9	4.9	3.5	33.6	7.2	3.9	5.5	22.4	15.5	1.6	11.2			
Norstat	29 Mar–4 Apr 2016	959	–	1.6	3.3	3.6	34.6	5.6	4.2	4.8	21.8	18.8	1.7	12.8			
TNS Gallup	29 Mar–1 Apr 2016	963	80.2	1.4	4.4	3.0	35.8	6.2	3.5	3.9	24.5	16.5	0.8	11.3			
Sentio	15–21 Mar 2016	1,000	70.5	1.6	3.4	3.8	32.3	5.8	4.7	5.6	24.3	17.6	1.1	8.0			
Ipsos MMI	14–16 Mar 2016	914	–	3.0	3.0	3.2	32.5	7.1	4.9	4.9	26.3	14.6	0.5	6.2			
Opinion Perduco	8–14 Mar 2016	–	75.0	1.7	3.6	3.7	33.1	5.4	4.5	3.9	26.6	16.4	1.3	6.5			
Respons Analyse	7–9 Mar 2016	1,001	80.0	1.8	3.6	3.0	34.1	5.8	4.6	5.1	24.1	16.2	1.7	10.0			
Norstat	1–7 Mar 2016	968	–	1.5	4.0	2.9	31.6	6.6	4.4	4.8	24.0	18.6	1.6	7.6			
Norfakta	1–2 Mar 2016	1,000	80.0	2.2	3.7	3.1	31.4	6.4	5.1	4.6	25.3	16.9	1.3	6.1			
Norstat	23–29 Feb 2016	972	–	1.5	5.7	3.0	31.2	6.3	3.6	4.9	25.9	17.1	0.8	5.3			
TNS Gallup	23–29 Feb 2016	975	80.3	2.0	4.0	3.2	33.6	6.1	4.4	4.7	24.8	15.8	1.5	8.8			
InFact	11–25 Feb 2016	2,037	–	2.0	4.1	4.3	34.0	7.4	3.7	4.7	21.2	16.7	1.9	12.8			
Sentio	16–21 Feb 2016	1,000	72.4	1.5	4.9	2.6	33.2	5.1	4.8	5.1	23.8	17.0	2.1	9.4			
Ipsos MMI	15–17 Feb 2016	931	–	2.5	4.2	4.9	33.8	5.9	4.5	3.8	21.4	18.2	0.7	12.4			
Opinion Perduco	9–15 Feb 2016	–	74.0	2.5	4.8	2.7	32.0	5.1	4.2	6.2	24.0	17.4	1.1	8.0			
Respons Analyse	11 Feb 2016	–	78.0	1.6	3.9	4.0	32.5	4.9	4.8	4.5	25.0	18.1	0.7	7.5			
Norstat	2–8 Feb 2016	–	–	1.1	3.0	4.4	32.4	5.8	4.2	5.5	25.1	18.0	0.4	7.3			
Norfakta	2–3 Feb 2016	1,000	74.0	2.4	4.2	3.2	31.9	4.9	4.2	4.9	26.5	16.9	0.9	5.4			
Norstat	25 Jan–1 Feb 2016	955	–	2.5	4.6	3.7	33.5	4.9	3.6	5.5	25.7	14.6	1.4	7.8			
TNS Gallup	25–29 Jan 2016	981	77.3	2.4	3.1	3.8	33.4	5.8	4.9	6.3	25.0	14.2	1.2	8.4			
InFact	14–28 Jan 2016	2,020	–	1.8	4.9	3.9	33.4	7.4	3.2	5.1	23.4	15.4	1.5	10.0			
Sentio	19–25 Jan 2016	1,000	73.0	1.5	3.8	4.4	32.5	6.4	3.4	4.3	24.1	17.2	2.3	8.4			
Ipsos MMI	18–20 Jan 2016	925	–	2.9	3.3	2.6	37.1	6.1	4.9	4.7	22.6	15.6	0.0	14.5			
Opinion Perduco	12–18 Jan 2016	948	74.0	2.5	4.1	4.3	32.2	5.4	4.1	4.2	25.3	17.5	0.4	6.9			
Respons Analyse	10–13 Jan 2016	1,000	81.0	2.0	4.5	4.2	30.8	5.7	4.7	5.1	23.4	17.8	1.8	7.4			
Norstat	5–11 Jan 2016	955	75.5	1.7	4.3	4.3	29.7	6.5	5.0	5.6	25.0	16.3	1.6	4.7			
TNS Gallup	4–8 Jan 2016	977	81.1	2.2	3.9	3.5	33.5	5.3	5.2	5.4	24.2	15.7	1.0	9.3			
Norfakta	5–6 Jan 2016	1,000	82.0	1.2	4.4	4.5	33.4	6.2	4.1	4.5	24.5	14.8	2.3	8.9			
Norstat	15–20 Dec 2015	967	–	1.7	3.5	3.0	33.4	4.5	3.2	6.0	23.8	19.2	1.7	9.6	43.1	52.2	9.1
Ipsos MMI	14–16 Dec 2015	916	–	1.9	3.6	5.4	34.0	7.6	4.0	4.5	20.9	16.9	1.0	13.1	47.1	46.3	0.8
Sentio	8–13 Dec 2015	1,000	68.0	2.2	3.6	4.4	35.6	7.1	4.0	4.3	20.6	16.6	1.6	15.0	48.5	45.5	3.0
Respons Analyse	7–9 Dec 2015	1,001	–	1.6	3.9	4.6	31.3	5.3	5.2	5.0	23.7	17.6	1.8	7.6	42.1	51.5	9.4
Opinion Perduco	1–7 Dec 2015	959	–	1.9	3.3	3.8	35.4	6.0	3.3	4.4	21.6	18.3	1.9	13.8	46.6	47.6	1.0
Norfakta	1–2 Dec 2015	1,000	81.0	1.9	3.5	5.3	33.5	4.7	4.5	5.1	20.7	18.2	2.6	12.8	43.6	48.5	4.9
Norstat	2 Dec 2015	–	–	1.8	4.3	4.0	34.6	5.8	3.4	5.4	22.5	17.3	1.0	12.1	46.5	48.6	2.1
TNS Gallup	24–30 Nov 2015	972	82.3	2.1	3.9	3.9	34.2	6.6	5.2	5.2	22.5	15.6	1.2	11.7	46.8	48.5	1.7
Norstat	26 Nov 2015	–	–	2.4	4.0	3.2	35.8	6.5	3.5	4.6	20.4	18.1	1.6	15.4	48.7	46.6	2.1
Ipsos MMI	16–19 Nov 2015	931	–	2.7	3.8	4.3	36.1	6.2	4.5	4.4	20.0	17.5	0.5	16.1	48.8	46.4	2.4
InFact	12–16 Nov 2015	2,037	–	2.0	4.4	3.4	35.3	7.2	4.2	5.3	20.3	16.1	1.7	15.0	48.9	45.9	3.0
Sentio	10–15 Nov 2015	1,000	73.9	1.6	3.0	4.7	34.9	7.0	3.6	5.2	20.3	18.2	1.4	14.6	46.5	47.3	0.8
Respons Analyse	9–11 Nov 2015	1,002	–	1.9	4.3	4.1	32.3	5.1	5.3	4.7	22.8	18.7	0.8	9.5	43.6	51.5	7.9
Opinion Perduco	3–9 Nov 2015	954	–	1.5	3.6	4.5	33.1	6.7	4.2	4.2	24.7	15.3	2.2	8.4	44.9	48.4	3.5
Norfakta	3–4 Nov 2015	1,000	–	1.5	4.1	5.2	35.2	4.3	5.2	4.9	21.7	16.6	1.3	13.5	45.1	48.4	3.3
Norstat	20 Oct–1 Nov 2015	–	–	1.9	3.9	3.9	35.5	6.0	4.2	5.5	23.8	13.3	1.9	11.7	47.3	46.8	0.5
TNS Gallup	26–31 Oct 2015	957	78.3	2.1	3.8	3.4	37.9	6.3	3.7	5.3	23.7	12.5	1.3	14.2	50.1	45.2	4.9
Norstat	20–26 Oct 2015	961	–	2.2	5.4	3.4	32.4	6.8	4.9	5.0	24.3	15.0	0.6	8.1	46.8	49.2	2.4
Ipsos MMI	19–21 Oct 2015	925	–	3.2	5.9	3.0	35.5	7.7	4.8	5.4	23.3	10.2	1.0	12.2	52.3	43.7	8.6
Sentio	13–19 Oct 2015	1,000	75.8	1.1	3.3	4.5	37.6	7.2	5.6	5.0	22.5	12.3	1.0	15.1	49.2	45.4	3.8
Respons Analyse	12–14 Oct 2015	1,001	–	2.1	4.3	4.0	34.5	6.3	4.9	5.3	24.3	13.2	1.1	10.2	47.2	47.7	0.5
Norstat	6–11 Oct 2015	968	–	1.2	3.4	4.2	40.2	5.8	5.2	5.6	20.3	12.8	1.3	19.9	50.6	43.9	6.7
Norfakta	6–7 Oct 2015	1,001	81.0	0.9	4.1	4.9	38.1	5.5	6.0	5.2	23.3	11.9	0.1	14.8	48.6	46.4	2.2
Opinion Perduco	29 Sep–5 Oct 2015	973	76.0	1.8	3.0	4.8	36.2	6.4	5.6	6.9	22.7	11.0	1.5	13.5	47.4	46.2	1.2
TNS Gallup	28 Sep–2 Oct 2015	967	79.3	2.1	5.0	4.0	37.9	5.8	5.1	5.9	23.5	9.5	1.6	14.4	50.8	44.0	6.8
Norstat	22–28 Sep 2015	948	–	1.7	3.5	5.1	34.8	8.0	5.0	5.6	22.0	12.4	2.0	12.8	48.0	45.0	3.0
Ipsos MMI	21–24 Sep 2015	926	–	2.4	3.8	3.5	37.9	6.6	4.9	5.7	23.2	11.3	0.6	14.7	50.7	45.1	5.6
Sentio	15–21 Sep 2015	1,000	–	1.4	4.0	5.9	36.7	5.5	5.0	5.6	21.6	12.5	1.9	15.1	47.6	44.7	2.9
Respons Analyse	10–12 Sep 2015	1,204	–	1.5	4.7	4.1	34.6	6.5	5.7	5.2	23.3	13.3	1.1	11.3	47.3	47.5	0.2
Norstat	1–6 Sep 2015	947	76.0	1.8	3.9	4.5	34.6	7.2	5.5	6.2	23.5	11.3	1.6	11.1	47.5	46.5	1.0
Norfakta	1–2 Sep 2015	1,000	–	1.2	3.1	5.4	35.6	5.6	4.1	5.9	25.6	12.6	0.9	10.0	45.5	48.2	2.7
Norstat	25–30 Aug 2015	949	71.9	1.1	5.2	5.1	34.4	6.4	6.2	5.3	22.5	12.4	1.4	11.9	47.1	46.4	0.7
TNS Gallup	27 Aug 2015	–	–	1.6	4.8	5.0	36.3	5.9	5.4	3.1	24.9	11.6	1.4	11.4	48.6	45.0	3.6
Sentio	18–23 Aug 2015	1,000	73.3	1.6	4.6	6.0	34.2	6.3	3.8	6.1	20.6	14.3	2.3	13.6	46.7	44.8	1.9
Respons Analyse	17–19 Aug 2015	1,003	–	2.2	3.9	5.0	33.1	6.2	5.2	5.0	23.8	12.8	2.8	9.3	45.4	46.8	1.4
Ipsos MMI	17–19 Aug 2015	925	–	1.4	4.8	4.0	38.3	4.2	5.2	4.6	24.0	13.0	0.5	14.3	48.7	46.8	1.9
Opinion Perduco	11–17 Aug 2015	969	73.0	1.4	3.5	4.7	37.6	6.2	4.8	5.2	21.7	12.8	2.2	15.9	48.7	44.5	4.2
TNS Gallup	10 Aug 2015	–	–	1.8	3.4	4.9	37.4	5.5	4.6	5.0	24.4	11.7	1.4	13.0	48.1	45.7	2.4
Norstat	4–9 Aug 2015	960	70.3	1.8	3.6	4.4	37.4	6.1	3.6	4.7	24.7	12.4	1.4	12.7	48.9	45.4	3.5
Norfakta	4–5 Aug 2015	1,001	–	1.4	3.2	3.9	36.4	5.6	3.4	5.4	26.2	12.7	1.8	10.2	46.6	47.7	1.1
Norfakta	7–8 Jul 2015	1,000	80.0	2.5	3.9	3.9	38.1	4.3	4.5	5.7	21.8	13.3	2.0	16.3	48.8	45.3	3.5
TNS Gallup	29 Jun–3 Jul 2015	966	78.4	1.5	4.1	5.0	38.8	4.6	5.7	4.6	22.8	11.0	1.7	16.0	49.0	44.1	4.9
Norstat	23–28 Jun 2015	959	–	1.0	4.9	3.9	35.8	6.4	3.5	5.1	23.4	14.2	1.6	12.4	48.1	46.2	1.9
Sentio	16–21 Jun 2015	1,000	71.4	1.8	2.8	3.9	38.1	5.7	3.9	5.3	22.0	16.4	0.3	16.1	48.4	47.6	0.8
Ipsos MMI	15–17 Jun 2015	924	–	2.2	4.0	4.5	36.8	5.9	4.0	5.6	21.4	14.3	1.4	15.4	48.9	45.3	3.6
Opinion Perduco	9–15 Jun 2015	950	74.0	1.0	3.3	6.5	41.1	5.2	3.8	5.6	22.8	9.6	1.3	18.3	50.6	41.8	8.8
TNS Gallup	10 Jun 2015	–	–	1.4	4.2	4.1	37.9	5.7	5.3	5.1	23.5	11.7	1.1	14.4	49.2	45.6	3.6
Respons Analyse	8–10 Jun 2015	1,000	78.0	1.2	3.6	4.8	35.9	5.7	5.3	5.3	24.7	12.9	0.6	11.2	46.4	48.2	1.8
Norstat	2–7 Jun 2015	957	69.3	1.1	3.5	4.3	41.0	5.1	4.5	5.2	22.0	12.1	1.3	19.0	50.7	43.8	6.9
Norfakta	2–3 Jun 2015	1,001	74.0	1.4	3.4	4.0	39.5	6.5	4.7	5.4	22.2	10.9	2.0	17.3	50.8	43.2	7.6
Norstat	26–31 May 2015	957	–	1.6	2.1	4.0	40.0	5.7	4.7	5.6	21.6	11.7	3.0	18.4	49.4	43.6	5.8
Sentio	21–26 May 2015	1,000	73.0	1.5	4.3	3.9	40.3	5.5	4.0	5.3	22.1	11.3	1.8	18.2	51.6	42.7	8.9
Ipsos MMI	18–20 May 2015	919	–	1.6	3.2	4.9	38.6	6.2	3.6	4.9	23.2	12.8	0.9	15.4	49.6	44.5	5.1
Norstat	12–18 May 2015	–	–	1.4	3.8	5.5	37.5	6.4	3.9	5.8	22.0	12.1	2.6	15.5	49.1	43.8	5.3
Opinion Perduco	5–11 May 2015	958	74.0	2.0	3.1	5.0	38.6	6.0	3.6	4.7	24.2	12.2	0.6	14.4	49.7	44.7	5.0
Norfakta	6–7 May 2015	1,001	–	1.3	3.1	3.6	37.6	5.3	5.2	5.6	22.8	12.5	2.5	14.8	47.3	46.1	1.2
Respons Analyse	4–6 May 2015	1,002	79.0	1.3	3.8	3.7	36.8	5.2	5.6	5.3	24.2	13.3	0.8	12.6	47.1	48.4	1.3
Norstat	28 Apr–3 May 2015	962	–	1.2	3.3	4.0	42.5	5.4	4.5	4.6	22.8	10.6	1.1	19.7	52.4	42.5	9.9
TNS Gallup	27–30 Apr 2015	950	78.9	1.7	4.7	3.3	35.0	6.5	5.1	5.2	26.5	11.1	1.0	8.5	47.9	47.9	Tie
Sentio	21–26 Apr 2015	1,000	72.3	1.2	3.7	3.0	37.4	5.0	4.9	5.6	26.1	11.3	1.8	11.3	47.3	47.9	0.6
Ipsos MMI	20–22 Apr 2015	917	–	1.9	4.0	3.6	38.8	5.1	5.0	5.4	22.3	13.0	1.0	16.5	49.8	45.7	4.1
Opinion Perduco	14–20 Apr 2015	956	74.0	0.5	3.1	4.4	40.4	6.1	4.6	7.1	21.8	11.3	0.6	18.6	50.1	44.8	5.3
Respons Analyse	13–15 Apr 2015	1,000	–	1.4	3.1	4.4	37.3	5.8	5.0	5.2	25.2	10.9	0.7	12.1	47.6	46.3	1.3
Norstat	7–13 Apr 2015	970	71.3	1.1	3.8	3.8	41.5	5.7	3.7	4.8	22.2	11.8	1.8	19.3	52.1	42.5	9.6
TNS Gallup	7–10 Apr 2015	960	77.8	2.0	5.1	4.1	39.6	4.7	6.5	5.4	22.6	8.6	1.4	17.0	51.4	43.1	8.3
Norfakta	7–8 Apr 2015	1,000	80.0	0.8	3.8	3.3	37.3	5.6	6.0	5.3	24.7	11.7	1.5	12.6	47.5	47.7	0.2
Norstat	23–29 Mar 2015	961	–	1.8	2.6	4.3	41.7	5.9	3.8	6.5	22.3	10.0	1.2	19.3	52.0	42.6	9.4
Ipsos MMI	23–25 Mar 2015	898	–	2.2	3.7	3.0	41.1	7.3	4.1	4.6	23.5	9.9	0.6	17.6	54.3	42.1	12.2
Sentio	17–25 Mar 2015	1,000	68.5	1.2	3.3	3.1	42.5	6.3	3.7	6.6	23.6	9.1	0.7	18.9	53.3	43.0	10.3
Opinion Perduco	10–16 Mar 2015	969	75.0	1.6	2.6	4.4	43.4	4.1	3.4	5.9	23.5	9.8	1.2	19.9	51.7	42.6	9.1
Respons Analyse	9–11 Mar 2015	1,000	78.0	1.1	3.0	2.7	42.1	6.1	6.3	6.3	21.3	9.5	1.5	20.8	52.3	43.4	8.9
Norstat	3–9 Mar 2015	967	–	0.9	3.8	3.6	40.5	6.6	4.2	4.5	21.9	12.2	1.9	18.6	51.8	42.8	9.0
Norfakta	3–4 Mar 2015	1,000	77.0	1.0	3.8	2.6	41.6	4.9	5.2	4.4	23.4	11.5	1.6	18.2	51.3	44.5	6.8
Norstat	24 Feb–2 Mar 2015	967	–	1.1	4.1	3.1	41.6	5.8	5.1	6.4	21.0	10.0	1.8	20.6	52.6	42.5	10.1
TNS Gallup	23–27 Feb 2015	959	78.5	2.0	4.8	3.0	38.8	5.8	4.3	5.0	25.0	10.7	0.7	13.8	51.4	45.0	6.4
Ipsos MMI	24–26 Feb 2015	946	–	2.7	3.7	3.7	41.3	5.5	4.2	5.6	21.5	11.3	0.4	19.8	53.2	42.6	10.6
InFact	20–24 Feb 2015	2,004	–	1.4	3.8	4.2	41.8	4.8	4.4	6.0	20.8	11.7	1.2	21.0	51.8	42.9	8.9
Sentio	17–24 Feb 2015	1,000	71.6	1.0	4.3	3.6	43.4	5.8	4.6	5.4	21.4	9.2	1.5	22.0	54.5	40.6	13.9
Opinion Perduco	10–16 Feb 2015	959	73.0	2.4	4.0	3.1	42.8	6.4	4.5	4.9	21.4	10.0	0.6	21.4	55.6	40.8	14.8
Respons Analyse	9–11 Feb 2015	1,001	–	1.8	4.1	3.3	41.1	5.9	5.2	5.8	21.7	9.9	1.1	19.4	52.9	42.6	10.3
Norstat	3–9 Feb 2015	956	–	1.3	3.6	3.9	39.7	6.5	4.1	4.7	21.8	13.5	0.8	17.9	51.1	44.1	7.0
Norfakta	3–4 Feb 2015	1,001	–	1.2	3.8	2.9	41.3	5.1	4.9	4.5	21.9	12.4	2.1	19.4	51.4	43.7	7.7
Norstat	27 Jan–2 Feb 2015	958	70.0	0.7	3.6	4.6	42.4	5.1	5.0	5.1	20.9	12.1	0.4	21.5	51.8	43.1	8.7
TNS Gallup	26–30 Jan 2015	957	79.5	1.5	4.1	3.5	42.3	6.0	4.9	5.8	20.3	10.6	1.0	22.0	53.9	41.6	12.3
Sentio	20–26 Jan 2015	1,000	73.6	1.0	3.3	2.7	42.7	4.8	4.6	5.2	23.4	10.2	2.5	19.3	51.8	43.4	8.4
Ipsos MMI	19–21 Jan 2015	940	–	1.5	3.9	3.2	42.4	5.0	4.2	5.6	22.7	11.2	0.9	19.7	52.8	43.7	9.1
Opinion Perduco	13–20 Jan 2015	965	74.0	1.4	3.5	3.5	40.6	5.3	4.7	5.6	22.9	11.9	0.7	17.7	50.8	45.1	5.7
Respons Analyse	12–14 Jan 2015	1,001	73.0	1.2	4.6	3.7	41.2	4.6	4.8	5.3	22.7	11.3	0.6	18.5	51.6	44.1	7.5
Norstat	6–12 Jan 2015	970	77.5	1.0	3.3	3.9	40.4	5.0	4.4	5.4	23.3	12.3	1.2	17.1	49.7	45.4	4.3
TNS Gallup	5–9 Jan 2015	957	79.2	1.2	3.2	3.2	42.8	7.0	5.7	4.7	20.9	10.5	0.8	21.9	54.2	41.8	12.4
Norfakta	6–7 Jan 2015	1,000	79.0	1.4	4.4	3.3	40.1	6.1	3.8	5.2	22.6	11.9	1.2	17.5	52.0	43.5	8.5
Norstat	12–21 Dec 2014	953	76.0	1.3	3.0	4.8	41.6	4.1	4.6	5.6	22.0	12.4	0.4	19.6	50.0	44.6	5.4
Ipsos MMI	15–18 Dec 2014	951	–	0.9	3.9	3.0	39.8	5.4	4.8	5.9	23.4	12.0	0.9	16.4	50.0	46.1	3.9
Sentio	9–16 Dec 2014	1,000	75.6	1.3	4.3	2.6	42.3	5.7	5.3	5.2	21.2	11.4	0.6	21.1	53.6	43.1	10.5
Respons Analyse	8–10 Dec 2014	1,000	84.0	1.6	3.5	3.4	42.0	6.0	5.1	6.1	22.0	10.1	0.2	20.0	53.1	43.3	9.8
Opinion Perduco	2–9 Dec 2014	963	75.0	1.1	3.5	4.2	41.8	5.6	5.0	5.6	22.3	10.2	0.6	19.5	52.0	43.1	8.9
Norfakta	2–3 Dec 2014	1,001	81.0	0.9	3.8	2.1	40.5	5.4	4.9	5.4	23.6	11.6	1.8	16.9	50.6	45.5	5.1
Norstat	26 Nov–2 Dec 2014	952	77.3	1.0	3.3	3.7	42.8	5.4	3.3	5.0	21.5	12.6	1.2	21.3	52.5	42.4	10.1
TNS Gallup	24–28 Nov 2014	961	79.2	2.1	4.7	4.4	40.7	4.1	4.8	4.1	23.9	10.0	1.2	16.8	51.6	42.8	8.8
InFact	24–27 Nov 2014	2,050	–	1.4	3.9	3.8	40.6	5.5	4.7	6.4	19.5	12.9	1.3	21.1	51.4	43.5	7.9
Norstat	18–24 Nov 2014	965	70.4	1.0	4.0	4.1	41.0	5.4	3.7	6.3	22.2	11.3	1.1	18.8	51.4	43.5	7.9
Ipsos MMI	17–20 Nov 2014	936	–	0.7	3.8	2.9	41.4	5.1	4.4	4.9	23.0	13.0	0.9	18.4	51.0	45.3	5.7
Sentio	10–17 Nov 2014	1,000	72.2	2.2	3.5	3.9	41.2	6.1	3.8	4.6	23.3	10.7	0.9	17.9	53.0	42.4	10.6
Respons Analyse	10–12 Nov 2014	1,001	79.0	1.3	3.5	3.6	36.2	5.4	7.0	7.2	23.1	11.9	0.8	13.1	46.4	49.2	2.8
Opinion Perduco	4–10 Nov 2014	960	73.0	1.3	3.8	3.5	42.2	5.2	3.9	5.9	22.0	11.4	0.9	20.2	52.5	43.2	9.3
Norfakta	4–5 Nov 2014	1,001	–	1.4	4.1	2.9	38.3	4.8	6.0	6.6	23.4	11.3	1.2	14.9	48.6	47.3	1.3
Norstat	4 Nov 2014	–	–	1.2	3.8	3.5	40.9	4.9	4.3	5.7	23.8	11.3	0.5	17.1	50.8	45.1	5.7
TNS Gallup	27–31 Oct 2014	942	79.9	2.0	4.4	3.6	39.8	5.4	4.9	5.4	23.4	9.5	1.4	16.4	51.6	43.2	8.4
InFact	13–30 Oct 2014	2,014	–	1.6	4.5	3.3	39.2	4.7	4.8	5.0	21.4	14.1	1.5	17.8	50.0	45.3	4.7
Norstat	21–27 Oct 2014	959	68.8	1.3	3.7	3.9	37.6	5.2	4.7	4.9	24.7	13.2	0.9	12.9	47.8	47.5	0.3
Ipsos MMI	20–23 Oct 2014	938	–	1.4	3.3	3.8	37.4	5.6	5.4	4.5	25.9	12.2	0.6	11.5	47.7	48.0	0.3
Sentio	14–20 Oct 2014	1,000	70.1	0.9	3.1	3.3	39.8	5.1	3.6	4.5	25.5	12.2	2.1	14.3	48.9	45.8	3.1
Respons Analyse	13–15 Oct 2014	1,000	–	1.3	3.4	3.7	38.4	5.0	4.4	5.0	24.6	12.8	1.4	13.8	48.1	46.8	1.3
Opinion Perduco	7–13 Oct 2014	963	–	0.6	2.7	3.0	39.0	4.6	4.5	4.4	25.9	13.8	1.4	13.1	46.9	48.6	1.7
Norfakta	7–8 Oct 2014	1,000	–	1.7	3.2	3.5	35.1	6.5	4.4	5.6	25.7	13.3	1.0	9.4	46.5	49.0	2.5
Norstat	29 Sep–5 Oct 2014	959	–	1.1	3.9	4.0	34.0	5.3	4.6	4.9	27.2	14.3	0.8	6.8	44.3	51.0	6.7
TNS Gallup	29 Sep–4 Oct 2014	965	77.4	1.6	4.7	4.5	36.5	4.2	5.2	3.7	25.3	13.8	0.6	11.2	47.0	48.0	1.0
Norstat	24–30 Sep 2014	952	71.4	1.5	3.2	3.4	36.3	5.3	3.9	4.5	26.0	14.9	0.9	10.3	46.3	49.3	3.0
Ipsos MMI	22–25 Sep 2014	937	–	1.6	4.0	2.6	34.0	4.7	4.4	4.9	28.5	13.0	1.8	5.5	44.3	50.8	6.5
Sentio	16–21 Sep 2014	1,000	72.2	1.5	4.2	3.8	34.1	5.6	4.5	5.5	25.8	13.7	1.3	8.3	45.4	49.5	4.1
Respons Analyse	15–17 Sep 2014	1,003	–	1.2	3.6	3.2	34.2	5.4	4.4	5.0	26.4	15.8	0.8	7.8	44.4	51.6	7.2
Opinion Perduco	9–15 Sep 2014	912	74.0	1.4	3.4	4.1	34.8	3.8	5.0	5.0	27.5	14.3	0.8	7.3	43.4	51.8	8.4
Norstat	1–7 Sep 2014	951	78.7	0.8	3.2	3.3	37.6	4.6	4.7	5.9	25.8	13.3	0.8	11.8	46.2	49.7	3.5
Norfakta	2–3 Sep 2014	1,001	77.0	1.0	3.6	3.2	36.2	5.3	4.4	4.8	25.2	15.3	1.0	11.0	46.1	49.7	3.6
Norstat	26 Aug–1 Sep 2014	948	–	1.2	2.4	3.9	35.3	4.9	4.8	4.8	27.0	15.1	0.5	8.3	43.8	51.7	7.9
TNS Gallup	25–30 Aug 2014	967	77.3	1.1	4.3	4.1	34.1	5.3	6.0	4.9	26.7	12.3	1.1	7.4	44.8	49.9	5.1
Sentio	19–24 Aug 2014	1,000	71.6	0.7	3.5	3.4	33.6	6.3	4.5	4.2	28.5	13.8	1.3	5.1	44.1	51.0	6.9
Ipsos MMI	19–21 Aug 2014	870	–	1.4	3.8	4.2	32.8	4.5	5.4	4.5	30.9	11.0	1.5	1.9	42.5	51.8	9.3
Respons Analyse	18–20 Aug 2014	1,001	80.0	1.1	4.6	3.3	34.8	5.0	4.5	5.5	25.4	14.7	1.1	9.4	45.5	50.1	4.6
Opinion Perduco	12–18 Aug 2014	962	–	0.8	2.5	4.2	36.6	5.1	4.7	4.7	27.1	13.4	1.8	9.5	45.0	49.9	4.9
Norstat	5–11 Aug 2014	967	–	1.2	4.4	3.1	34.3	4.9	4.5	5.5	25.5	15.3	0.4	8.8	44.8	50.8	6.0
TNS Gallup	4–8 Aug 2014	952	76.9	1.8	4.0	4.1	33.7	4.9	5.0	6.2	26.6	12.6	0.8	7.1	44.4	50.4	6.0
Norfakta	5–6 Aug 2014	1,006	81.0	1.2	3.9	3.5	36.0	5.7	4.5	4.9	24.6	15.0	0.7	11.4	46.8	49.0	2.2
Norfakta	1–2 Jul 2014	1,003	72.0	1.1	2.7	3.7	36.8	5.1	5.2	5.1	26.3	12.8	1.2	10.5	45.7	49.4	3.7
Norstat	24–30 Jun 2014	954	70.5	1.5	2.9	3.8	34.4	5.9	5.5	4.2	26.6	14.1	1.1	7.8	44.7	50.4	5.7
TNS Gallup	24–30 Jun 2014	927	80.3	2.0	3.4	3.3	37.6	5.0	5.2	4.6	27.6	10.0	1.4	10.0	48.0	47.4	0.6
Sentio	17–22 Jun 2014	1,000	–	1.3	3.1	3.5	34.5	4.8	4.0	5.4	25.4	15.5	2.5	9.1	43.7	50.3	6.6
Ipsos MMI	17–19 Jun 2014	945	–	1.4	3.1	4.1	35.5	5.5	4.7	4.2	28.5	12.1	0.9	7.0	45.5	49.5	4.0
Opinion Perduco	10–16 Jun 2014	974	–	1.4	3.4	3.6	36.1	5.3	4.8	5.5	25.3	14.2	0.4	10.8	46.2	49.8	3.6
Norstat	3–9 Jun 2014	960	–	0.9	3.7	4.3	35.4	4.9	3.8	5.8	26.1	14.5	0.6	9.3	44.9	50.2	5.3
Norfakta	3–4 Jun 2014	1,000	72.0	1.3	3.0	3.1	34.5	6.1	5.5	5.7	25.7	13.5	1.6	8.8	44.9	50.4	5.5
Respons Analyse	2–4 Jun 2014	1,002	–	1.1	4.3	3.3	33.6	5.1	4.7	5.4	26.5	14.4	1.6	7.1	44.1	51.0	6.9
Norstat	28 May–3 Jun 2014	956	71.7	1.0	2.5	4.0	35.8	4.4	4.7	5.0	26.9	14.1	1.4	8.9	43.7	50.7	7.0
TNS Gallup	23–28 May 2014	949	83.4	1.7	4.5	3.1	34.4	6.1	6.5	4.6	26.1	11.7	1.3	8.3	46.7	48.9	2.2
InFact	6–28 May 2014	2,087	–	1.2	4.5	3.8	33.7	5.0	4.7	5.7	26.0	14.3	1.3	7.7	44.4	50.7	6.3
Sentio	20–25 May 2014	1,000	72.0	1.5	3.3	2.3	34.9	5.3	5.9	5.4	26.2	13.1	2.1	8.7	45.0	50.6	5.6
Ipsos MMI	22 May 2014	938	–	2.0	3.7	2.8	36.0	5.1	4.6	4.9	25.6	14.5	0.9	10.4	46.8	49.6	2.8
Opinion Perduco	13–19 May 2014	961	–	1.9	3.9	3.3	32.7	4.8	5.4	5.7	26.9	15.1	0.4	5.8	43.3	53.1	9.8
Norstat	6–11 May 2014	971	71.9	0.9	3.8	4.1	35.9	4.6	4.7	4.8	26.5	14.3	0.4	9.4	45.2	50.3	5.1
Norfakta	6–7 May 2014	1,001	79.0	0.7	4.0	3.2	33.9	4.9	5.4	4.9	28.1	13.3	1.6	5.8	43.5	51.7	8.2
Respons Analyse	5–7 May 2014	1,000	84.0	1.3	4.3	3.5	33.2	5.7	4.8	5.7	26.8	12.8	1.6	6.4	44.5	50.1	5.6
Norstat	29 Apr–5 May 2014	970	70.3	1.3	4.4	3.1	34.4	5.7	5.0	5.4	26.2	13.7	0.1	8.2	45.8	50.3	4.5
TNS Gallup	25–30 Apr 2014	951	81.2	1.7	4.5	4.2	32.2	4.9	5.3	4.8	27.8	12.5	2.1	4.4	43.3	50.4	7.1
InFact	22–28 Apr 2014	2,061	–	1.4	4.0	3.7	34.2	4.6	4.7	5.0	25.3	15.8	1.3	8.9	44.2	50.8	6.6
Sentio	22–27 Apr 2014	1,000	75.6	0.7	3.7	3.7	31.7	5.1	5.9	5.4	28.9	13.2	1.7	2.8	41.2	53.4	12.2
Ipsos MMI	22–24 Apr 2014	939	–	2.1	4.8	2.3	32.8	4.6	6.3	5.6	27.9	13.2	0.6	4.9	44.3	53.0	8.7
Opinion Perduco	9–16 Apr 2014	973	75.0	1.0	3.1	4.0	34.5	4.7	5.3	5.2	27.5	13.8	0.8	7.0	43.3	51.8	8.5
Respons Analyse	7–9 Apr 2014	1,001	–	1.4	2.9	2.4	34.0	4.3	5.3	5.4	29.8	13.6	0.9	4.2	42.6	54.1	11.5
Norstat	1–7 Apr 2014	964	73.1	1.4	3.4	3.7	35.4	3.9	5.0	5.1	25.9	15.7	0.5	9.5	44.1	51.7	7.6
Norfakta	2–3 Apr 2014	1,000	–	0.9	3.7	3.5	34.5	4.9	4.7	4.9	27.8	13.9	1.2	6.7	44.0	51.3	7.3
InFact	25–31 Mar 2014	2,014	–	1.2	3.6	2.9	33.5	4.9	5.3	5.4	26.8	14.9	2.1	6.7	43.2	52.4	9.2
Norstat	25–31 Mar 2014	980	73.0	1.2	3.4	3.1	35.7	4.5	4.7	5.8	27.0	13.9	1.6	8.7	44.8	51.4	6.6
TNS Gallup	25–31 Mar 2014	957	82.7	1.1	4.5	3.5	33.0	4.5	6.1	5.9	29.5	11.3	0.6	3.5	43.1	52.8	9.7
Ipsos MMI	25–27 Mar 2014	951	–	1.6	5.0	3.1	33.7	4.9	5.5	4.6	27.6	12.8	1.3	6.1	45.2	50.5	5.3
Sentio	18–24 Mar 2014	1,000	74.6	1.0	3.9	2.6	35.3	5.1	4.3	5.1	26.2	15.1	1.4	9.1	45.3	50.7	5.4
Opinion Perduco	11–17 Mar 2014	968	–	1.1	3.9	2.5	35.7	4.7	5.0	4.7	26.6	14.9	1.0	9.1	45.4	51.2	5.8
Respons Analyse	10–12 Mar 2014	1,002	–	1.4	3.6	2.8	34.7	4.4	6.1	5.1	27.7	13.9	0.3	7.0	44.1	52.8	8.7
Norstat	4–10 Mar 2014	968	73.0	1.4	2.8	3.6	35.2	4.7	4.7	5.0	26.4	14.6	1.7	8.8	44.1	50.7	6.6
Norfakta	4–5 Mar 2014	1,000	83.0	1.3	3.5	3.4	33.4	5.2	4.6	5.9	26.6	15.5	0.6	6.8	43.4	52.6	9.2
Norstat	25 Feb–3 Mar 2014	968	69.7	2.1	3.7	3.9	34.3	5.0	4.2	4.6	27.0	13.9	1.2	7.3	45.1	49.7	4.6
TNS Gallup	24–28 Feb 2014	976	77.5	1.5	4.3	3.2	35.2	4.9	6.2	4.7	27.6	11.6	0.8	7.6	45.9	50.1	4.2
Ipsos MMI	25–27 Feb 2014	972	–	2.0	3.3	3.0	34.4	4.7	5.2	5.3	26.5	15.0	0.6	7.9	44.4	52.0	7.6
InFact	24–27 Feb 2014	2,029	–	0.9	3.6	3.3	33.6	4.9	5.0	4.8	26.8	15.5	1.6	6.8	43.0	52.1	9.1
Sentio	18–24 Feb 2014	1,000	75.7	1.0	4.0	2.2	33.7	5.1	4.3	5.1	29.9	12.8	1.8	3.8	43.8	52.1	8.3
Opinion Perduco	11–17 Feb 2014	974	77.0	1.3	3.2	2.9	34.8	4.3	5.1	4.9	27.2	15.0	1.2	7.6	43.6	52.2	8.6
Respons Analyse	10–12 Feb 2014	1,002	81.0	0.9	4.8	2.5	34.7	4.6	5.1	5.0	27.0	14.3	1.1	7.7	45.0	51.4	6.4
Norstat	4–10 Feb 2014	971	70.1	1.4	3.9	3.8	33.1	4.9	4.3	5.9	28.8	13.0	0.9	4.3	43.3	52.0	8.7
Norfakta	4–5 Feb 2014	1,000	–	1.2	3.1	3.1	34.3	4.0	4.6	5.2	28.8	14.5	1.2	5.5	42.6	53.1	10.5
Norstat	28 Jan–3 Feb 2014	970	–	1.4	3.9	4.0	32.1	5.9	5.1	5.1	30.3	11.7	0.5	1.8	43.3	52.2	8.9
TNS Gallup	27–31 Jan 2014	1,373	78.6	1.1	4.2	2.8	34.1	5.2	4.9	5.6	29.2	11.9	0.9	4.9	44.6	51.6	7.0
InFact	27–29 Jan 2014	2,056	–	1.6	4.0	3.3	32.4	4.6	5.2	5.3	28.3	14.1	1.3	4.1	42.6	52.9	10.3
Sentio	21–27 Jan 2014	1,000	–	0.9	3.1	3.0	35.3	4.3	3.8	4.7	28.4	15.5	1.0	6.9	43.6	52.4	8.8
Ipsos MMI	21–23 Jan 2014	947	–	1.8	3.5	2.4	34.6	4.9	4.5	5.2	28.0	14.2	0.9	6.6	44.8	51.9	7.1
Opinion Perduco	14–20 Jan 2014	979	77.0	0.9	4.0	3.9	33.8	4.5	5.5	4.8	28.8	13.4	0.4	5.0	43.2	52.5	9.3
Respons Analyse	13–15 Jan 2014	1,002	–	1.2	3.7	2.7	33.7	4.3	4.6	5.2	31.0	12.6	1.0	2.7	42.9	53.4	10.5
Norstat	7–13 Jan 2014	984	–	1.2	4.2	3.1	32.7	4.3	5.2	6.3	30.5	11.7	1.3	2.2	42.4	53.7	11.3
TNS Gallup	6–10 Jan 2014	956	84.2	1.3	4.8	3.2	32.4	5.1	4.2	5.5	28.6	12.6	2.3	3.8	43.6	50.9	7.3
Norfakta	7–8 Jan 2014	1,000	83.0	0.4	4.1	3.3	32.9	3.9	4.9	5.5	29.4	14.7	1.0	3.5	41.3	54.5	13.2
Ipsos MMI	17–19 Dec 2013	951	–	1.6	4.6	2.7	32.1	5.0	5.1	4.6	29.9	13.2	1.3	2.2	43.3	52.8	9.5
Norstat	17–19 Dec 2013	979	74.3	1.1	3.4	3.2	34.9	4.3	4.5	5.7	27.0	14.7	1.4	7.9	43.7	51.9	8.2
Sentio	10–16 Dec 2013	1,000	79.5	1.1	3.9	3.0	34.0	4.9	5.6	4.4	27.2	13.9	1.3	6.8	43.9	51.1	7.2
InFact	10–11 Dec 2013	2,042	–	1.4	4.0	3.4	35.3	4.8	4.6	5.1	25.8	14.3	1.3	9.5	45.5	49.8	4.3
Respons Analyse	9–11 Dec 2013	1,000	–	1.5	3.6	2.3	33.2	4.6	5.4	5.2	28.7	14.5	1.0	4.5	42.9	53.8	10.9
Opinion Perduco	3–9 Dec 2013	980	81.0	0.8	3.5	3.1	32.7	4.9	5.4	5.8	27.9	14.8	1.1	4.8	41.9	53.9	12.0
Norfakta	3–4 Dec 2013	1,000	85.0	1.3	4.0	2.4	32.7	4.5	4.7	5.3	28.7	14.6	1.8	4.0	42.5	53.3	10.8
Norstat	26 Nov–2 Dec 2013	–	–	1.0	3.7	3.3	32.8	4.8	5.2	5.4	28.2	14.1	1.5	4.6	42.3	52.9	10.6
TNS Gallup	25–30 Nov 2013	952	83.8	1.3	4.5	2.6	31.5	5.0	6.9	6.4	27.8	12.9	1.2	3.7	42.3	54.0	11.7
InFact	26–27 Nov 2013	2,073	–	1.2	4.1	3.1	33.4	4.7	4.7	6.1	26.4	14.9	1.4	7.0	43.4	52.1	8.7
Norstat	19–25 Nov 2013	976	77.2	1.3	3.4	3.2	31.7	5.3	5.7	5.3	28.0	15.2	1.0	3.7	41.7	54.2	12.5
Ipsos MMI	19–21 Nov 2013	937	–	0.9	4.4	3.1	30.8	4.8	6.0	5.2	30.1	13.5	1.0	0.7	40.9	54.8	13.9
Sentio	12–18 Nov 2013	1,000	80.2	1.3	3.5	3.0	34.5	4.3	4.8	6.2	27.0	14.3	1.1	7.5	43.6	52.3	8.7
Respons Analyse	11–13 Nov 2013	1,003	–	1.1	3.8	2.8	35.1	5.3	4.5	4.6	26.2	15.1	1.5	8.9	45.3	50.4	5.1
Opinion Perduco	5–11 Nov 2013	979	83.0	1.5	3.2	3.3	31.6	5.6	6.1	6.0	27.9	14.3	0.6	3.7	41.9	54.3	12.4
Norstat	7 Nov 2013	–	–	0.9	4.3	3.8	31.4	5.3	5.0	5.0	27.1	15.3	1.9	4.3	41.9	52.4	10.5
Norfakta	5–6 Nov 2013	1,000	85.0	1.1	4.5	2.8	30.8	4.8	4.8	5.1	29.5	15.3	1.3	1.3	41.2	54.7	13.5
TNS Gallup	28 Oct–1 Nov 2013	960	86.3	1.4	5.3	3.8	31.0	4.9	5.8	6.2	28.1	12.4	1.2	2.9	42.6	52.5	9.9
Norstat	22–28 Oct 2013	974	78.3	1.1	4.0	3.9	32.9	4.9	5.5	4.9	26.9	15.1	0.7	6.0	42.9	52.4	9.5
Ipsos MMI	22–24 Oct 2013	955	–	1.7	4.2	2.3	32.0	4.4	5.5	5.4	28.6	14.9	0.8	3.4	42.3	54.4	12.1
InFact	21–23 Oct 2013	2,051	–	1.4	4.5	3.4	33.7	4.6	5.0	5.5	26.2	14.2	1.4	7.5	44.2	50.9	6.7
Sentio	15–22 Oct 2013	1,000	81.2	0.9	3.6	2.8	29.7	5.0	5.7	5.6	30.6	13.7	2.3	0.9	39.2	55.6	16.4
Respons Analyse	14–16 Oct 2013	1,000	–	1.0	4.0	2.9	31.7	5.1	5.8	5.8	28.1	14.8	1.0	3.6	41.8	54.5	12.7
Opinion Perduco	8–14 Oct 2013	982	84.0	1.5	4.1	4.1	31.7	4.9	5.7	6.5	27.1	13.8	0.8	4.6	42.2	53.1	10.9
Norstat	1–7 Oct 2013	984	77.4	1.3	4.2	4.3	30.5	4.7	6.4	4.7	25.7	17.0	1.1	4.8	40.7	53.8	13.1
TNS Gallup	30 Sep–4 Oct 2013	969	85.1	1.3	4.4	2.9	33.4	4.1	6.1	5.6	27.3	13.3	1.5	6.1	43.2	52.3	9.1
Norfakta	1–2 Oct 2013	1,000	–	1.3	3.7	2.7	32.7	4.8	4.9	5.1	28.4	15.0	1.4	4.3	42.5	53.4	10.9
Norstat	24–30 Sep 2013	973	–	1.0	3.5	3.9	32.5	5.2	4.3	6.6	26.5	15.8	0.7	6.0	42.2	53.2	11.0
Ipsos MMI	24–26 Sep 2013	954	–	2.2	3.8	3.6	30.0	5.1	5.6	6.5	27.9	14.5	1.1	2.1	41.1	54.5	13.4
Opinion Perduco	25 Sep 2013	966	85.0	1.1	4.6	4.0	31.6	4.9	5.1	5.0	26.3	16.9	0.5	5.3	42.2	53.3	11.1
Sentio	10–16 Sep 2013	1,000	82.9	1.2	4.6	2.8	31.5	5.3	5.8	5.4	27.6	14.3	1.6	3.9	42.6	53.1	10.5
2013 election	9 Sep 2013	—	78.3	1.1	4.1	2.8	30.8	5.5	5.2	5.6	26.8	16.3	1.8	4.0	41.5	53.9	12.4

== See also ==
- Opinion polling for the 2021 Norwegian parliamentary election
